= Tschiertschen-Praden =

- Former municipality
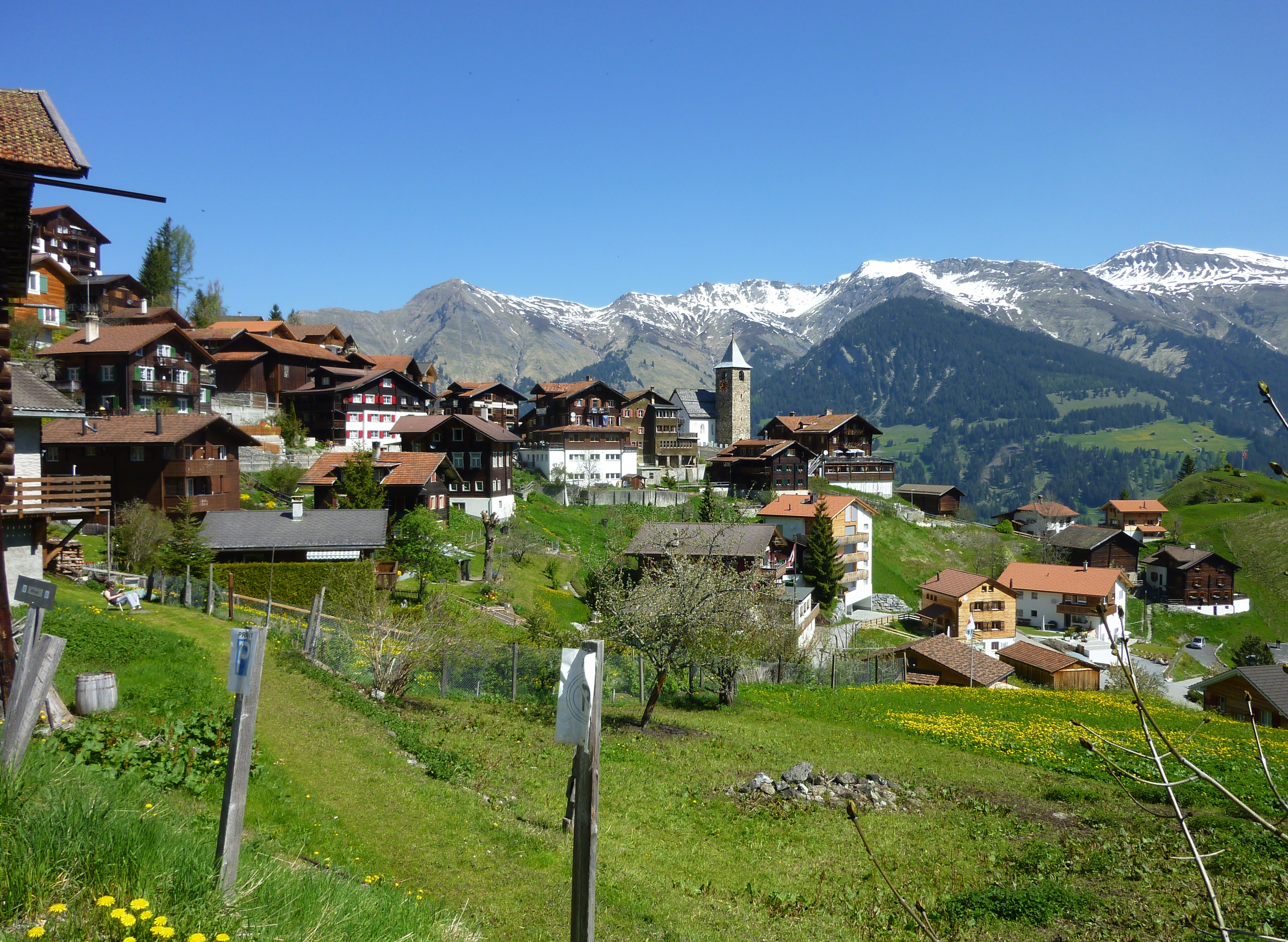
- Tschiertschen village

- Flag Coat of arms
- Location of Tschiertschen-Praden
- Location within Switzerland Location within Canton of Graubünden
- Coordinates: 46°49′N 9°36′E
- Country: Switzerland
- Canton: Graubünden
- District: Plessur

Government
  - Executive: Gemeinderat
  - Mayor: Gemeindepräsident

Area
  - Total: 27.74 km^{2} (10.71 sq mi)
- Elevation: 1,350 m (4,430 ft)

Population (December 2020)
  - Total: 300
  - Density: 11/km^{2} (28/sq mi)
- Time zone: UTC+01:00 (CET)
  - Summer (DST): UTC+02:00 (CEST)
- Postal code: 7063, 7063
- SFOS number: 3932
- ISO 3166 code: CH-GR
- Localities: Praden, Tschiertschen
- Surrounded by: Calfreisen, Castiel, Churwalden, Maladers, Arosa, Lüen, Molinis, Parpan, Vaz/Obervaz
- Website: www.tschiertschen-praden.ch

Tschiertschen-Praden is a former municipality in the Plessur Region in the Grisons, Switzerland. It was formed on 1 January 2009 through the merger of Praden and Tschiertschen. On 1 January 2025 the former municipality of Tschiertschen-Praden merged into the municipality of Chur.

== Geography ==
Tschiertschen has a combined area, as of 2006, of 27.8 km^{2} (10.7 sq mi).

Before 2017, the municipality was located in the Churwalden sub-district of the Plessur district on the mountain slopes above the left side of the Schanfigger valley. It consists of the haufendorf village (an irregular, unplanned and quite closely packed village, built around a central square) of Tschiertschen at an elevation of 1,351 m (4,432 ft) and the linear villages of Inner- and Usserpraden at an elevation of 1,100 m (3,600 ft) and 1,250 m (4,100 ft) respectively.

== Demographics ==
Tschiertschen-Praden has a population (as of 31 December 2020) of 300.

The combined historical population is given in the following table:

year	population
1803	280
1850	268
1900	270
1950	272
2000	326

== Weather ==
Tschiertschen has an average of 123.9 days of rain per year and on average receives 1,095 mm (43.1 in) of precipitation. The wettest month is August during which time Tschiertschen receives an average of 140 mm (5.5 in) of precipitation. During this month there is precipitation for an average of 12.7 days. The month with the most days of precipitation is June, with an average of 13.1, but with only 128 mm (5.0 in) of precipitation. The driest month of the year is February with an average of 61 mm (2.4 in) of precipitation over 12.7 days.
