= Plessur District =

Coordinates: 46.8181°N 9.60651°E

Plessur District Bezirk Plessur
- District
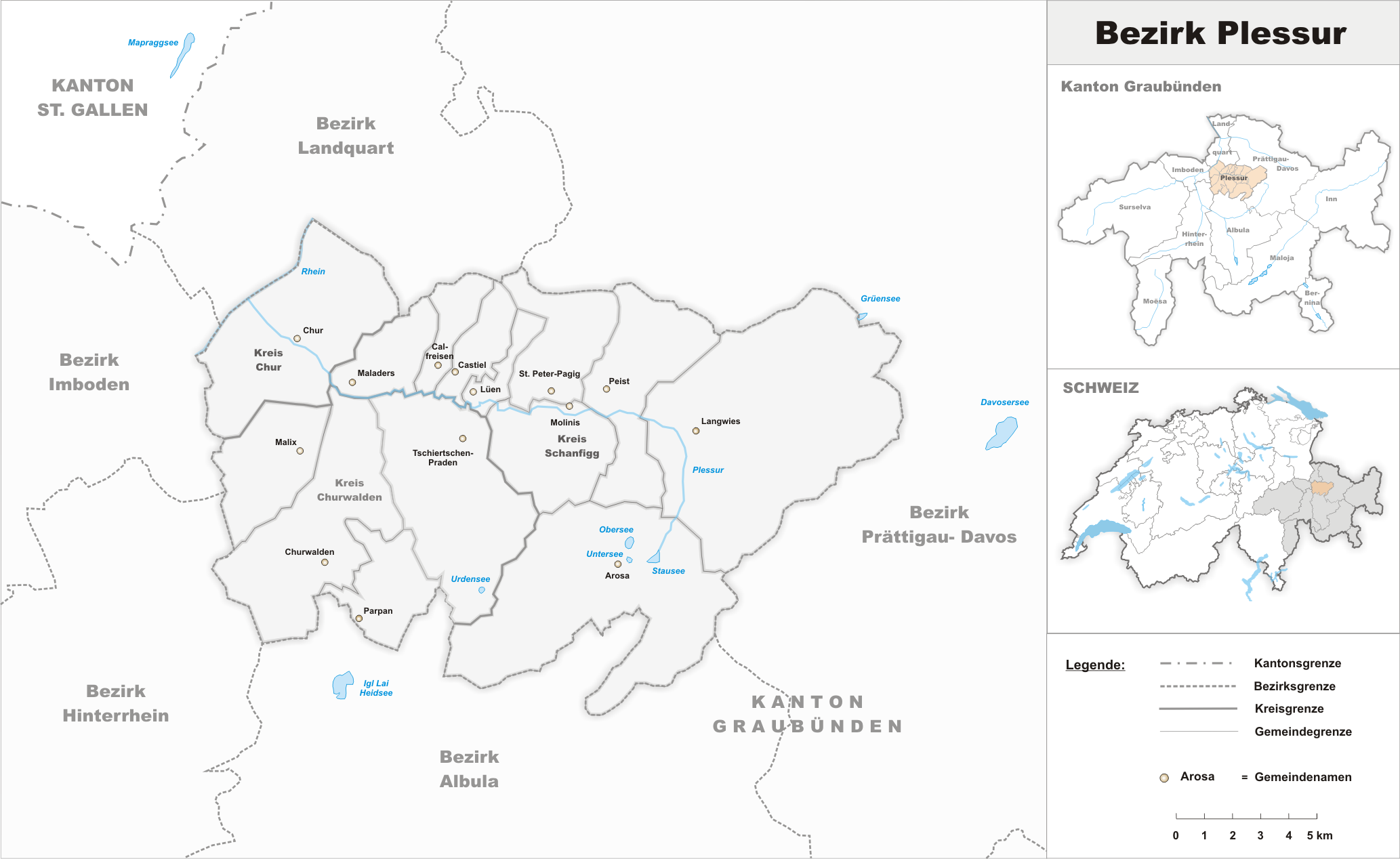
- Country: Switzerland
- Canton: Graubünden
- Capital: Chur

Area
  - Total: 266.75 km^{2} (102.99 sq mi)

Population (December 2015)
  - Total: 40,707
  - Density: 152.60/km^{2} (395.24/sq mi)
- Time zone: UTC+1 (CET)
  - Summer (DST): UTC+2 (CEST)
- Municipalities: 5

Plessur District (German: Bezirk Plessur, Romansh: District da la Plessur) is a former administrative district in the canton of Graubünden, Switzerland. It had an area of 266.73 km^{2} (102.99 sq mi) and has a population of 40,707 in 2015. The former district is named after the river Plessur which crosses it. However, the region along the Plessur –and therefore the whole valley–is called Schanfigg. It was replaced with the Plessur Region on 1 January 2017 as part of a reorganization of the Canton.

Plessur District consisted of three Kreise (sub-districts) Chur, Churwalden and Schanfigg, which are formed from a total of twelve municipalities:

Chur sub-district
Municipality	Population (31 December 2020)	Area (km^{2})
Chur	36,336	28.01

Churwalden sub-district
Municipality	Population (31 December 2020)	Area (km^{2})
Churwalden	1,936	48.58^{a}
Tschiertschen-Praden	300	27.74

^a Includes the area of Malix and Parpan which merged into Churwalden on 1 January 2010.

Schanfigg sub-district
Municipality	Population (31 December 2020)	Area (km^{2})
Arosa	3,162	42.54 ^{b}
Maladers	519	7.61

^b Includes the area of Calfreisen, Castiel, Langwies, Lüen, Molinis, Peist and St. Peter-Pagig which merged into Arosa in 2013.

== Mergers ==
- On 1 January 2010 the municipalities of Malix and Parpan merged into the municipality of Churwalden.
- On 1 January 2013 the former municipalities of Calfreisen, Castiel, Langwies, Lüen, Molinis, Peist and St. Peter-Pagig merged into the municipality of Arosa.

== Languages ==
Languages of Plessur District, GR
Languages	Census 2000	
Languages	Number	Percent
German	32,655	81.9%
Romansh	1,873	4.7%
Italian	1,831	4.6%
TOTAL	39,892	100%

== See also ==
- Araschgen
