= Araschgen =

Coordinates: 46°50′10″N 9°32′31″E

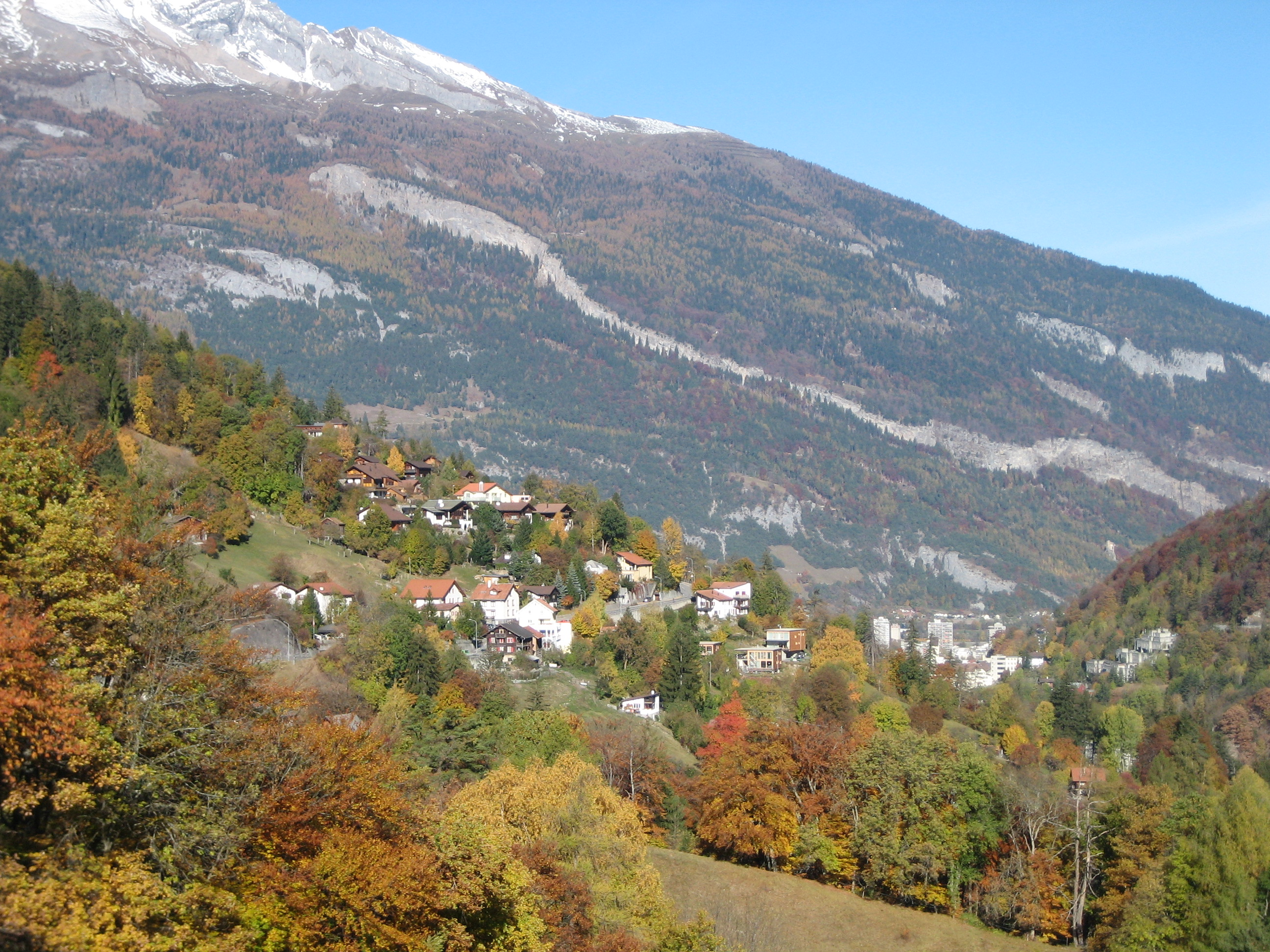
View of Araschgen

Araschgen is a village near Chur in the Plessur district, Switzerland. It is part of the municipality of Churwalden.

The village was first mentioned in the mid-14th century as Giraschga. The mineral springs in the village were first mentioned in the 16th century and were rediscovered in 1863. During the late 19th century, a mineral spa and water bottling plant were built between Araschgen and Passugg. The Chur-Tschiertschen road was built through the village from 1887 to 1894. In the late 20th century the village became a bedroom community of Chur.

In 2014 the village kindergarten closed due to budget concerns. It was reopened with eight students for the 2016/17 school year to reduce crowding in Chur schools.
