= Praden =

- Former municipality
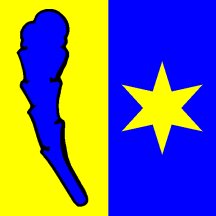
- Flag Coat of arms
- Location of Praden
- Location within Switzerland Location within Canton of Graubünden
- Coordinates: 46°49′N 9°34′E
- Country: Switzerland
- Canton: Graubünden
- District: Plessur

Area
  - Total: 6.42 km^{2} (2.48 sq mi)
- Elevation: 1,161 m (3,809 ft)

Population (December 2008)
  - Total: 109
  - Density: 17.0/km^{2} (44.0/sq mi)
- Time zone: UTC+01:00 (CET)
  - Summer (DST): UTC+02:00 (CEST)
- Postal code: 7063
- SFOS number: 3914
- ISO 3166 code: CH-GR
- Surrounded by: Calfreisen, Castiel, Churwalden, Lüen, Maladers, Tschiertschen
- Website: www.praden.ch

Praden (Romansh: Prada) is a village in the municipality of Tschiertschen-Praden in the district of Plessur in the canton of Graubünden in Switzerland.

The formerly independent municipality merged with Tschiertschen to form Tschiertschen-Praden on January 1, 2009.

== History ==
Praden is first mentioned in 1157 as de Pradis.

== Geography ==
Praden has an area, as of 2006, of 6.4 km^{2} (2.5 sq mi). Of this area, 26.2% is used for agricultural purposes, while 67.9% is forest. Of the rest of the land, 1.1% is settled (buildings or roads) and the remainder (4.8%) is non-arable (rivers, glaciers or mountains).

The village is located in the Churwalden sub-district of the Plessur district on the mountain slopes above the left side of the Schanfigger valley. It consists of the linear villages of Inner- and Usserpraden at an elevation of 1,100 m (3,600 ft) and 1,250 m (4,100 ft) respectively. In 2009 Praden merged with Tschiertschen to form Tschiertschen-Praden.

== Demographics ==
Praden had a population (as of 2008) of 109, of which 8.3% are foreign nationals. Over the last 10 years the population has decreased at a rate of -14.5%. Most of the population (as of 2000) speaks German (97.0%), with French being second most common ( 1.0%) and Romansh being third ( 1.0%).

As of 2000, the gender distribution of the population was 48.1% male and 51.9% female. The age distribution, as of 2000, in Praden is; 11 children or 10.9% of the population are between 0 and 9 years old. 14 teenagers or 13.9% are 10 to 14, and 7 teenagers or 6.9% are 15 to 19. Of the adult population, 9 people or 8.9% of the population are between 20 and 29 years old. 16 people or 15.8% are 30 to 39, 21 people or 20.8% are 40 to 49, and 14 people or 13.9% are 50 to 59. The senior population distribution is 4 people or 4.0% of the population are between 60 and 69 years old, 3 people or 3.0% are 70 to 79, there are 2 people or 2.0% who are 80 to 89.

In the 2007 federal election the most popular party was the SP which received 60% of the vote. The next three most popular parties were the SVP (28.4%), the FDP (10.5%) and the CVP (1.1%).

The entire Swiss population is generally well educated. In Praden about 89.7% of the population (between age 25-64) have completed either non-mandatory upper secondary education or additional higher education (either University or a Fachhochschule).

Praden has an unemployment rate of 0.96%. As of 2005, there were 8 people employed in the primary economic sector and about 4 businesses involved in this sector. 1 person is employed in the secondary sector and there is 1 business in this sector. 14 people are employed in the tertiary sector, with 4 businesses in this sector.

The historical population is given in the following table:

| year | population |
|---|---|
| 1803 | 150 |
| 1850 | 144 |
| 1900 | 131 |
| 1950 | 98 |
| 1980 | 51 |
| 2000 | 101 |
