= Lüen =

- Former municipality
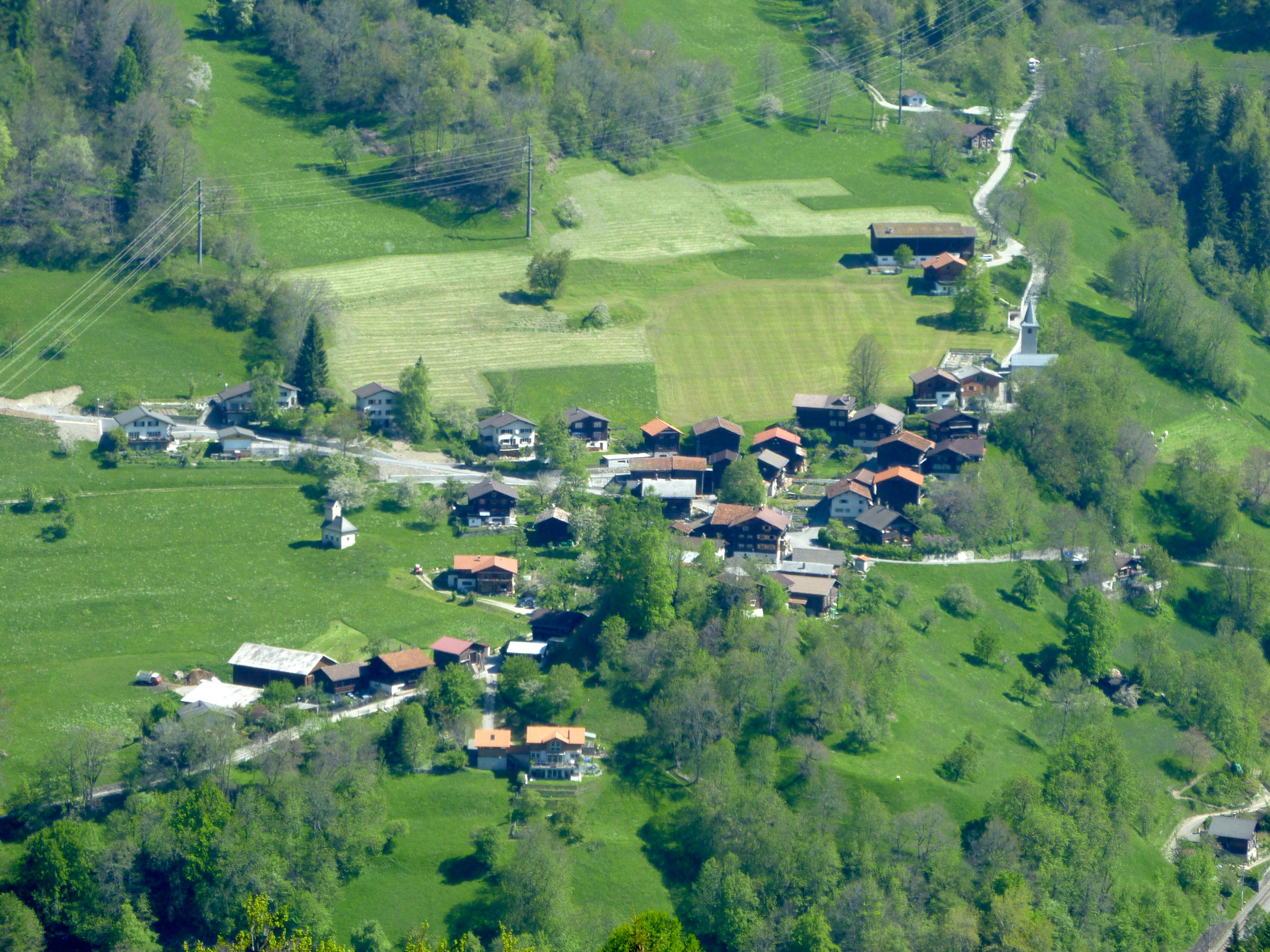
- Lüen village

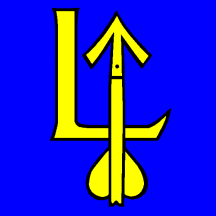
- Flag Coat of arms
- Location of Lüen
- Location within Switzerland Location within Canton of Graubünden
- Coordinates: 46°50′N 9°37′E
- Country: Switzerland
- Canton: Graubünden
- District: Plessur

Area
  - Total: 3.46 km^{2} (1.34 sq mi)
- Elevation: 990 m (3,250 ft)

Population (2010)
  - Total: 84
  - Density: 24/km^{2} (63/sq mi)
- Time zone: UTC+01:00 (CET)
  - Summer (DST): UTC+02:00 (CEST)
- Postal code: 7027
- SFOS number: 3925
- ISO 3166 code: CH-GR
- Surrounded by: Castiel, Praden, St. Peter-Pagig, Tschiertschen
- Website: www.lueen.ch

Lüen is a former municipality in the district of Plessur in the canton of Graubünden in Switzerland. On 1 January 2013 the former municipalities of Lüen, Calfreisen, Castiel, Langwies, Molinis, Peist and St. Peter-Pagig merged into the municipality of Arosa.

== History ==
Lüen is first mentioned in 1084 as Leune.

== Geography ==
Before the merger, Lüen had a total area of 3.5 km^{2} (1.4 mi^{2}). Of this area, 37% is used for agricultural purposes, while 52.3% is forested. Of the rest of the land, 1.4% is settled (buildings or roads) and the remainder (9.2%) is non-productive (rivers, glaciers or mountains).

The former municipality is located in the Schanfigg sub-district of the Plessur district. It consists of the haufendorf village (an irregular, unplanned and quite closely packed village, built around a central square) of Lüen on the north face of the mid-Schanfigg.

In Lüen is the Lüen-Castiel railway station, on the Chur-Arosa railway line, which also serves Castiel.

== Demographics ==
Lüen had a population (as of 2010) of 84. As of 2008, 10.6% of the population was made up of foreign nationals. Over the last 10 years the population has decreased at a rate of -15.6%. Most of the population (as of 2000) speaks German (91.9%), with English being second most common ( 4.1%) and Dutch being third ( 2.7%).

As of 2000, the gender distribution of the population was 49.4% male and 50.6% female. The age distribution, as of 2000, in Lüen is; 8 children or 10.8% of the population are between 0 and 9 years old and 11 teenagers or 14.9% are between 10 and 19. Of the adult population, 1 person is between 20 and 29 years old. 14 people or 18.9% are between 30 and 39, 14 people or 18.9% are between 40 and 49, and 4 people or 5.4% are between 50 and 59. The senior population distribution is 14 people or 18.9% of the population are between 60 and 69 years old, 6 people or 8.1% are between 70 and 79, there are 2 people or 2.7% who are between 80 and 89.

In the 2007 federal election the most popular party was the SVP which received 69.4% of the vote. The next three most popular parties were the SP (19%), the FDP (8.8%) and the CVP (2.7%).

In Lüen about 70% of the population (between age 25-64) have completed either non-mandatory upper secondary education or additional higher education (either university or a Fachhochschule).

Lüen has an unemployment rate of 1.75%. As of 2005, there were 5 people employed in the primary economic sector and about 2 businesses involved in this sector. 9 people are employed in the tertiary sector, with 3 businesses in this sector.

The historical population is given in the following table:

year	population
1850	83
1900	68
1950	77
2000	74

== Sights ==
The architectonical look of the town of Lüen is a good example of how the Latin and the Germanic cultures intermixed in the Grisons: in Lüen there is a mixture of houses built with block of woods (typical of the so-called Blockhäuser imported in the area by the late Walser migrations) and of houses built of stone (typical of the indigenous Romanic populations). The train station of Lüen-Castiel was built in 1914. The romanesque church of St. Zeno was built in 1084. The interior is covered with gothic paintings from the studio of the Waltensburger Master, from the mid 14th Century. Interior of the Church:

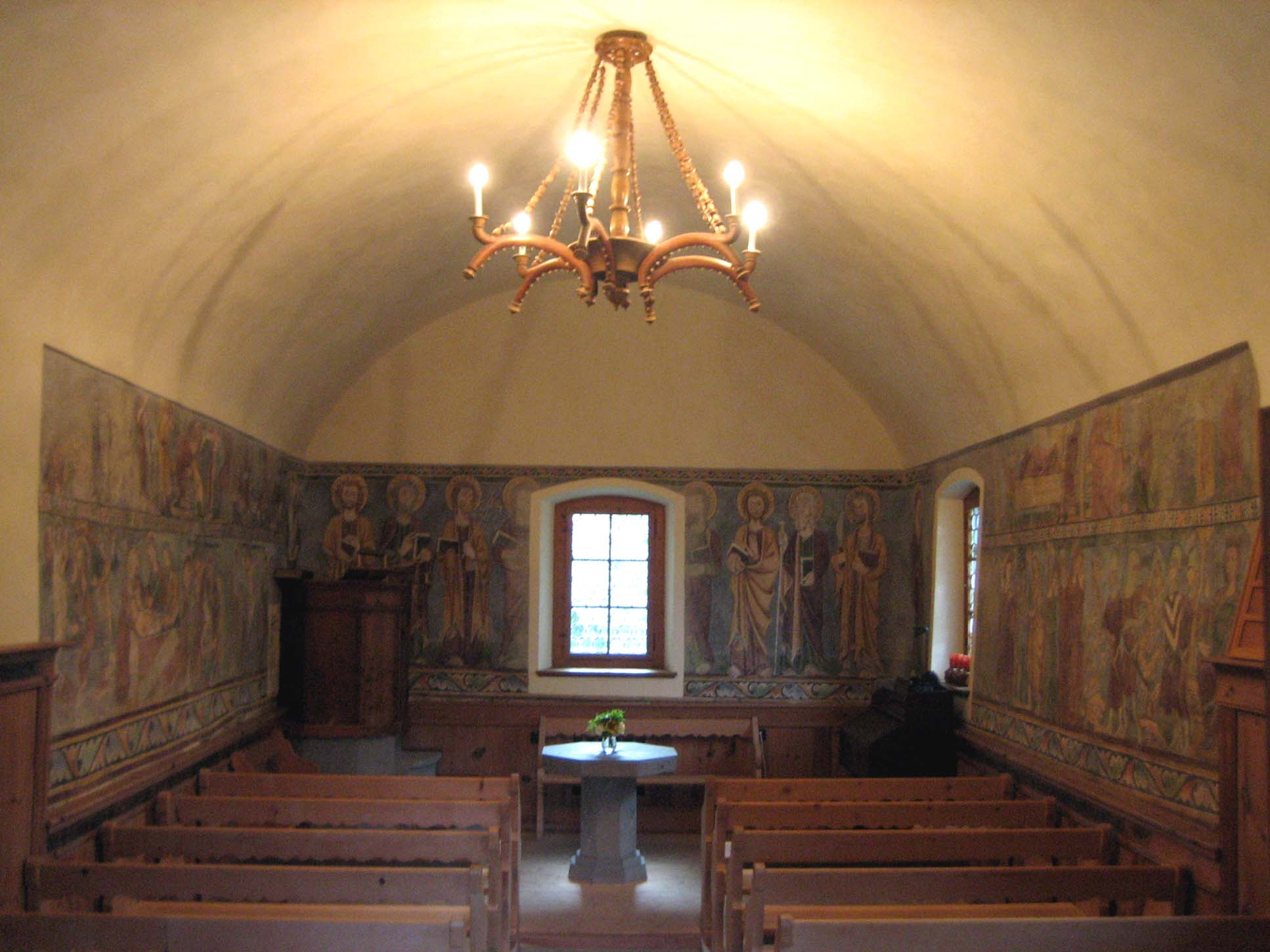
Interior of the church

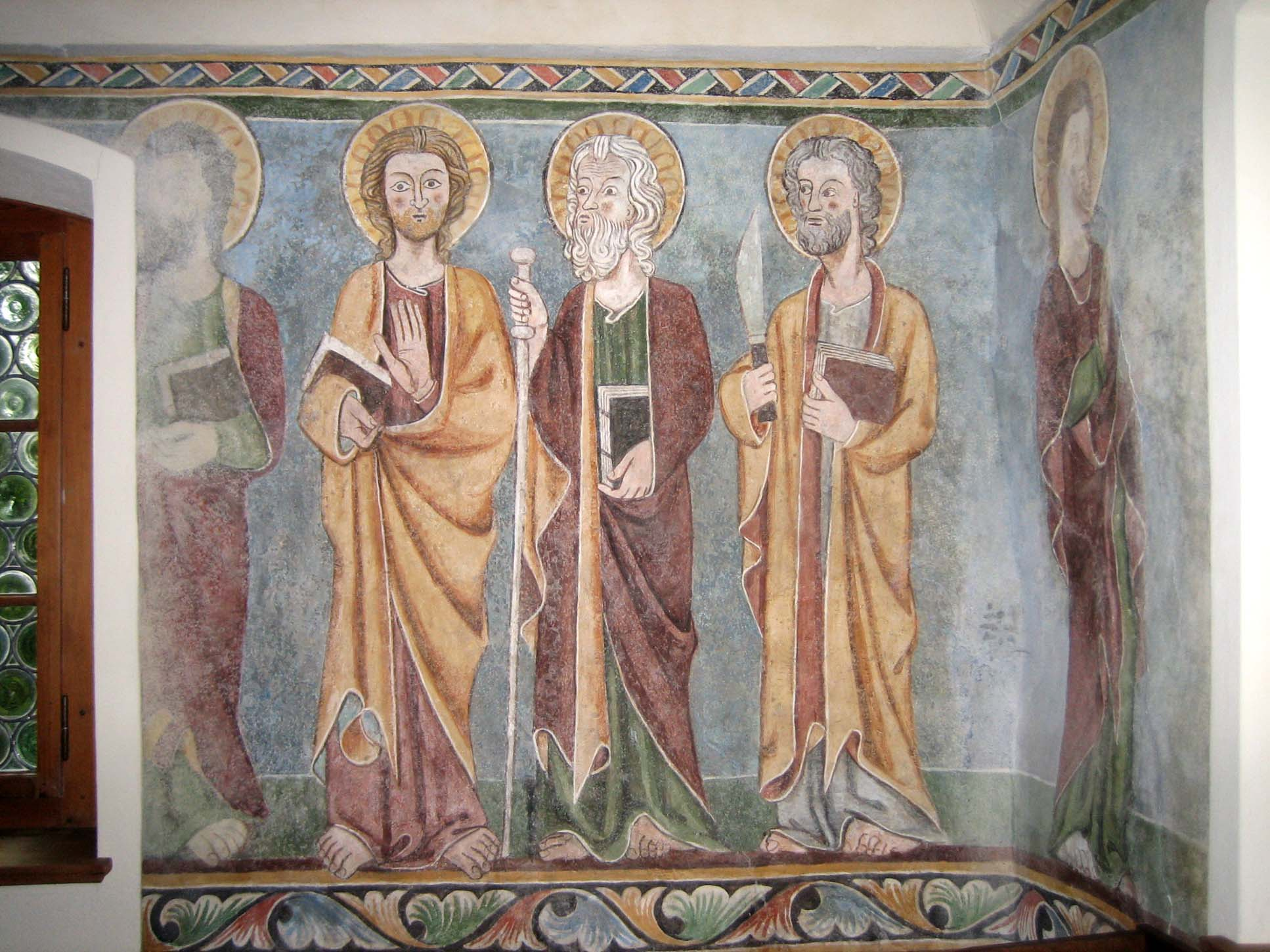
Apostles

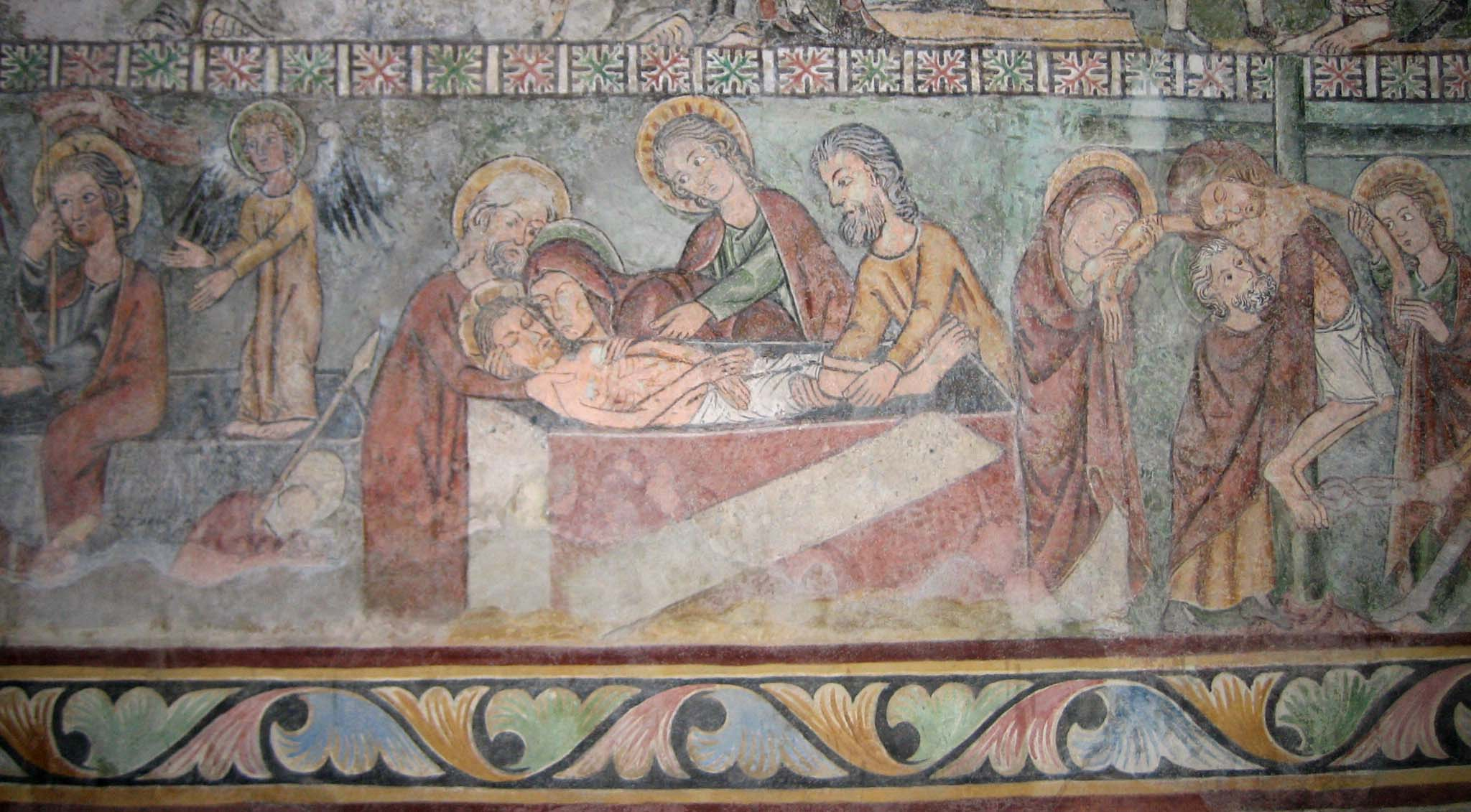
Laying out Jesus

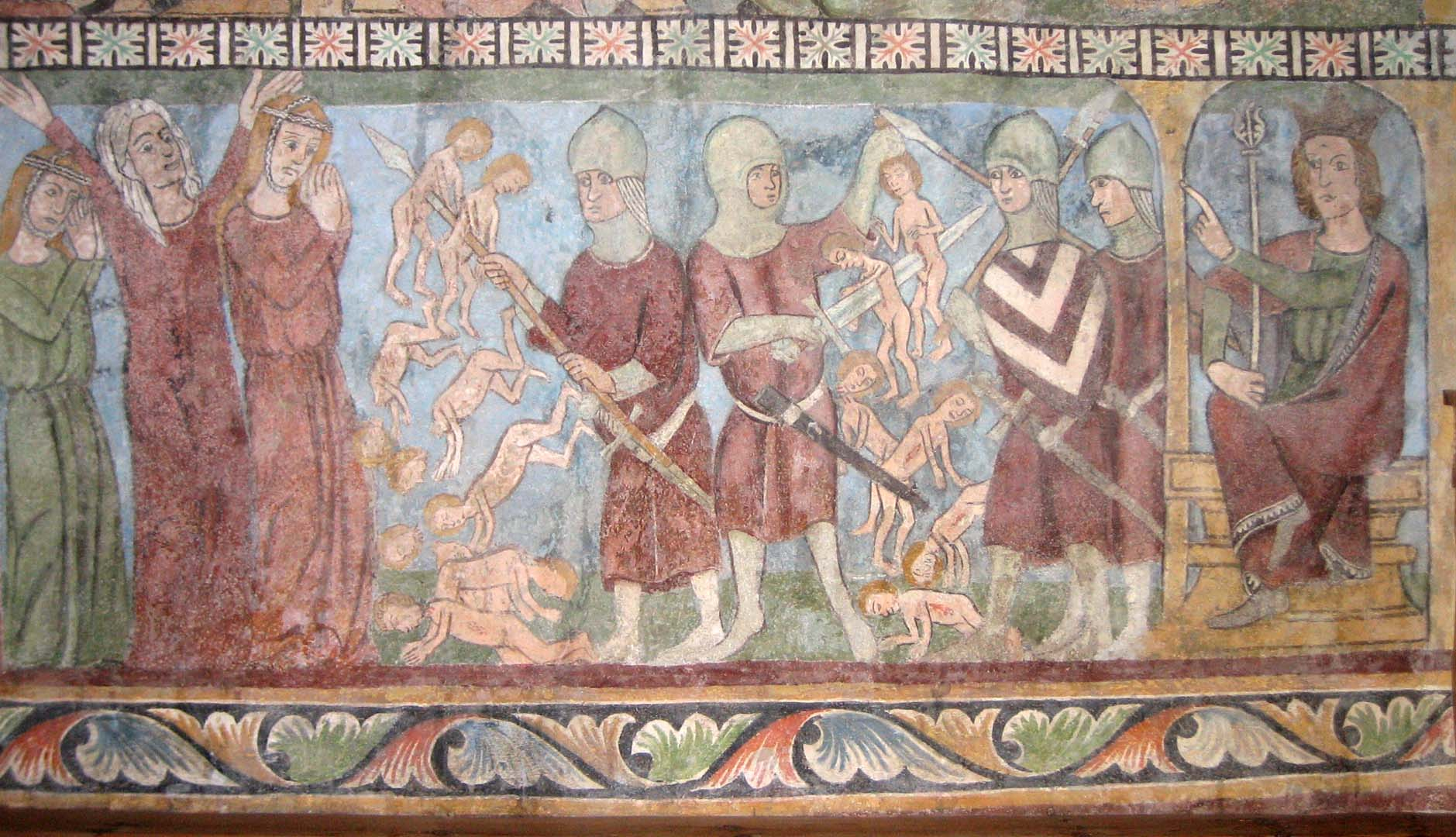
Massacre of the Innocents

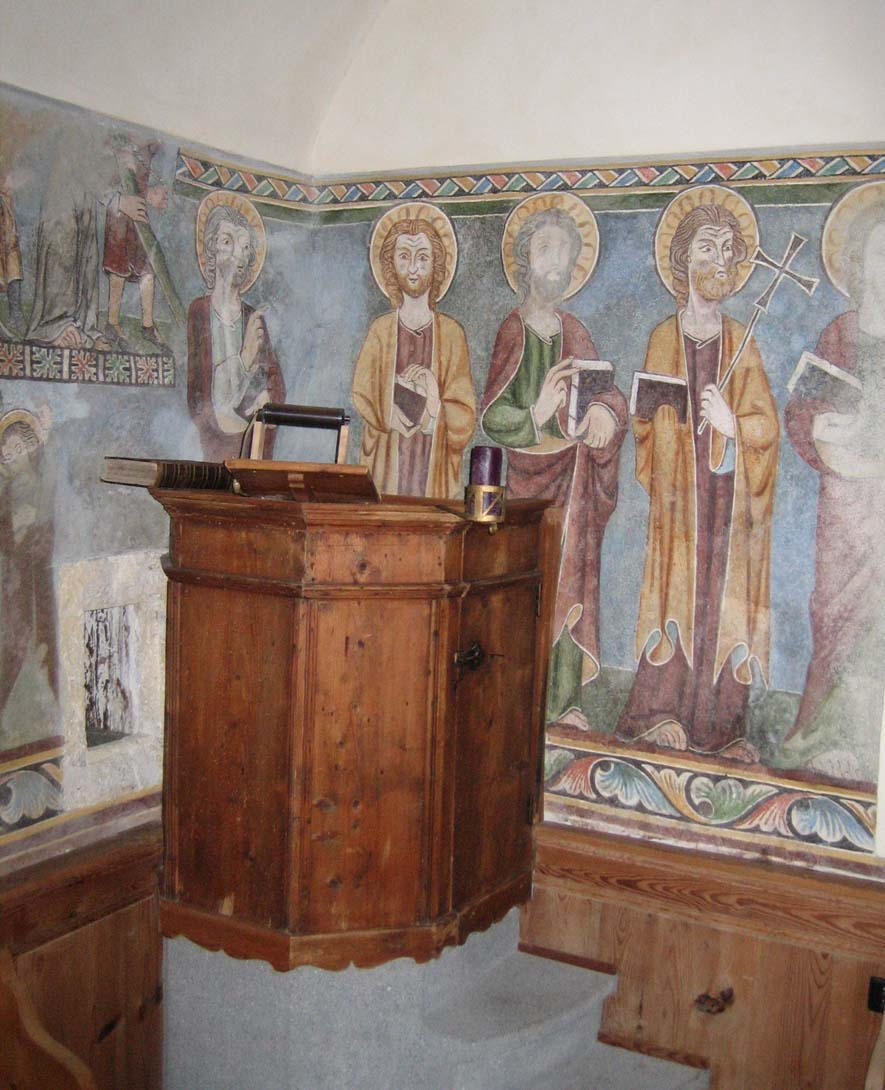
Pulpit and Apostles
