= Churwalden =

- Municipality
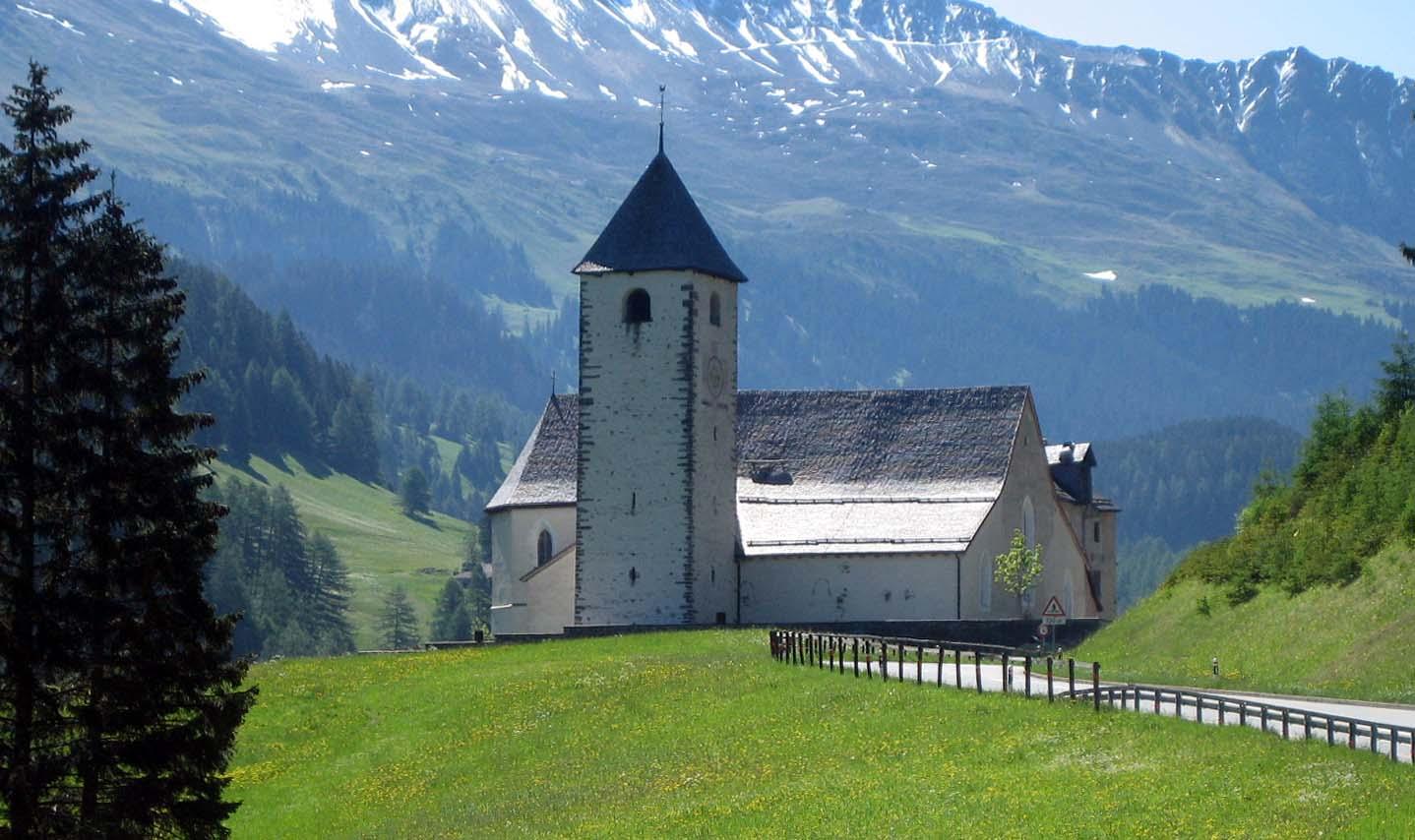
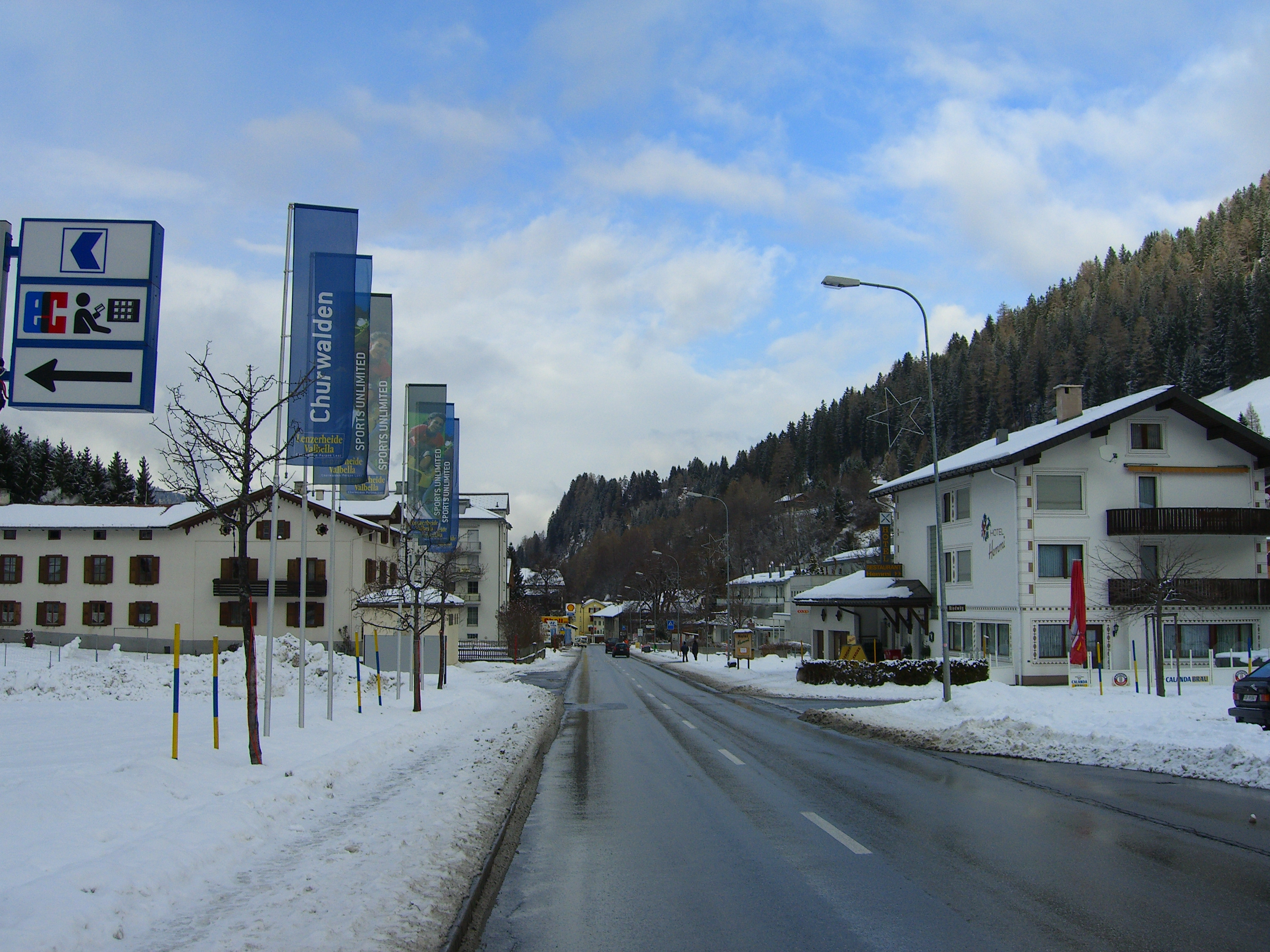
- Church of Churwalden Dorfstrasse

- Flag Coat of arms
- Location of Churwalden
- Location within Switzerland Location within Canton of Grisons
- Coordinates: 46°47′N 9°33′E
- Country: Switzerland
- Canton: Grisons
- District: Plessur

Government
  - Mayor: Alex Gubelmann

Area
  - Total: 26.68 km^{2} (10.30 sq mi)
- Elevation: 1,230 m (4,040 ft)

Population (December 2015)
  - Total: 2,030
  - Density: 76.1/km^{2} (197/sq mi)
- Time zone: UTC+01:00 (CET)
  - Summer (DST): UTC+02:00 (CEST)
- Postal code: 7075
- SFOS number: 3911
- ISO 3166 code: CH-GR
- Localities: Passugg, Sagens
- Surrounded by: Almens, Chur, Maladers, Malix, Parpan, Praden, Scheid, Trans, Tschiertschen, Vaz/Obervaz
- Website: www.churwalden.ch

Churwalden is a municipality in the Plessur Region in the canton of the Grisons in Switzerland. It incorporates the former municipalities of Malix and Parpan.

== History ==
Churwalden is first mentioned in 1149 as silva Augeria. In 1191 it was mentioned as de Curwalde.

== Geography ==
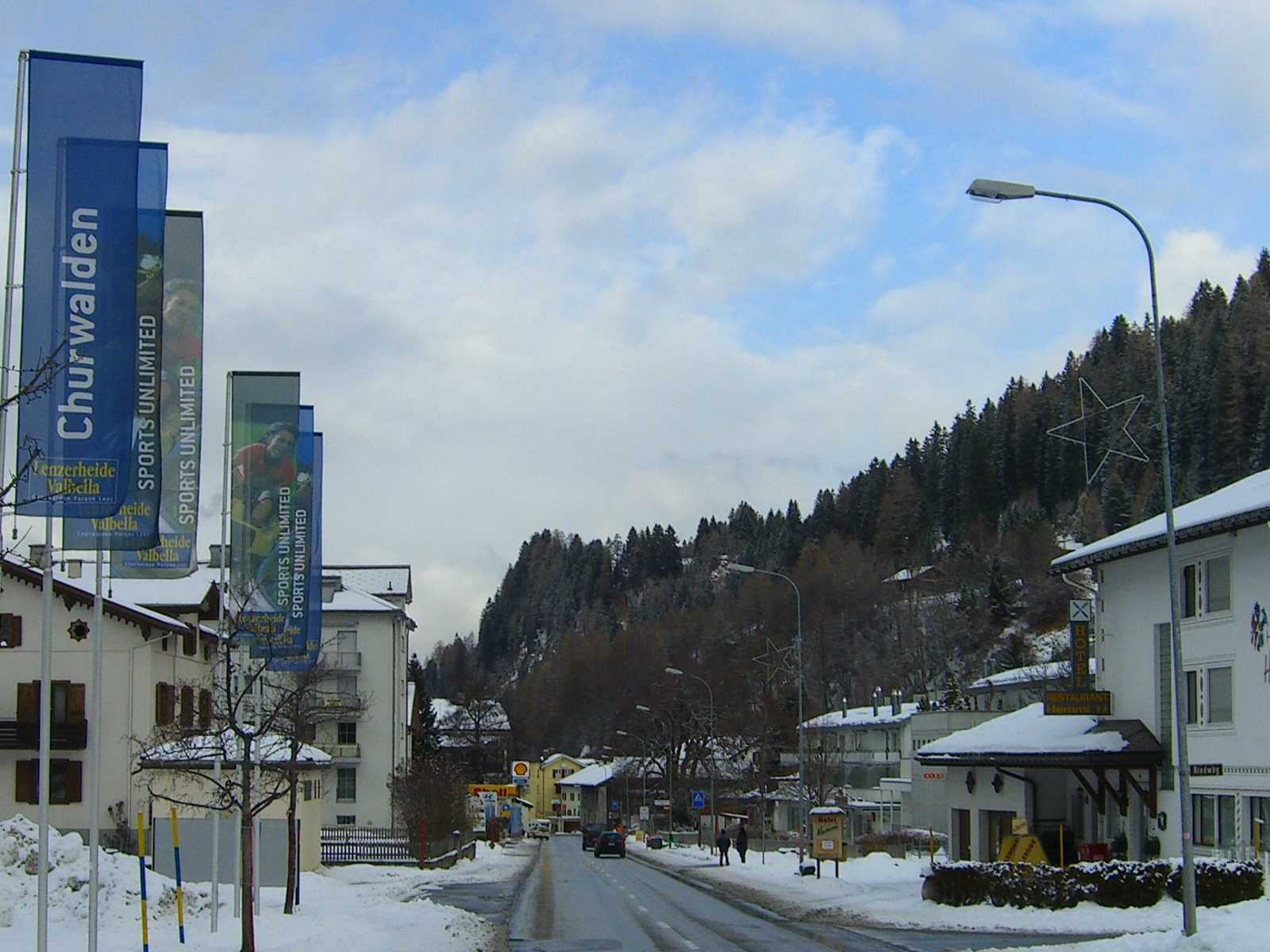
Main street in Churwalden

Aerial view (1954)

Churwalden has an area, (as of the 2004/09 survey) of 48.53 km^{2} (18.74 sq mi). Of this area, about 43.8% is used for agricultural purposes, while 39.6% is forested. Of the rest of the land, 3.7% is settled (buildings or roads) and 12.9% is unproductive land. In the 2004/09 survey a total of 128 ha (320 acres) or about 2.6% of the total area was covered with buildings, an increase of 27 ha (67 acres) over the 1984/85 amount. Of the agricultural land, 1 ha (2.5 acres) is used for orchards and vineyards, 1,003 ha (2,480 acres) is fields and grasslands and 1,382 ha (3,410 acres) consists of alpine grazing areas. Since 1984/85 the amount of agricultural land has decreased by 252 ha (620 acres). Over the same time period the amount of forested land has increased by 208 ha (510 acres). Rivers and lakes cover 33 ha (82 acres) in the municipality.

Before 2017, the municipality was located in Churwalden sub-district of the Plessur district on the Rabiusa river and near the Lenzerheide Pass. The village lies in the valley between the cantonal capital Chur and the resort Lenzerheide. Lenzerheide Bergbahnen offers access to the skiing area of Lenzerheide as well as Stätzerhorn, Danis, Scalottas, and Rothorn. The longest summer toboggan run (Rodelbahn) in Switzerland, 3.5 kilometers (2.2 mi) long, is situated at Pradaschier.

At the end of 2013 the ski resort was linked with Arosa by cable-car, creating the new ski resort of Arosa Lenzerheide. Since then transport passes work in both resorts.

The municipality consists of the linear village of Churwalden and the hamlets of Passugg, Araschgen and scattered farm houses. The municipalities of Churwalden, Malix, and Parpan sought approval from the Canton to merge into a combined municipality to be known as Churwalden, and did so on 1 January 2010.

== Demographics ==
Churwalden has a population (as of December 2020) of 1,936. As of 2015, 18.9% of the population are resident foreign nationals. In 2015 a small minority (121 or 6.0% of the population) was born in Germany. Over the last 5 years (2010-2015) the population has changed at a rate of -5.23%. The birth rate in the municipality, in 2015, was 10.3, while the death rate was 9.3 per thousand residents.

Most of the population (as of 2000) speaks German (79.7%), with Turkish being second most common (3.9%) and Romansh being third (2.3%).

As of 2015, children and teenagers (0–19 years old) make up 17.0% of the population, while adults (20–64 years old) are 65.1% of the population and seniors (over 64 years old) make up 17.9%. In 2015 there were 879 single residents, 870 people who were married or in a civil partnership, 123 widows or widowers, 155 divorced residents and 3 people who did not answer the question.

In 2015 there were 918 private households in Churwalden with an average household size of 2.17 persons. In 2015 about 59% of all buildings in the municipality were single family homes, which is greater than the percentage in the canton (49.4%) and about the same as the percentage nationally (57.4%). Of the 419 inhabited buildings in the municipality, in 2000, about 54.2% were single family homes and 26.7% were multiple family buildings. Additionally, about 32.0% of the buildings were built before 1919, while 7.9% were built between 1991 and 2000. In 2014 the rate of construction of new housing units per 1000 residents was 6.29. The vacancy rate for the municipality, in 2016, was 0.92%.

The historical population is given in the following chart:

== Heritage sites of national significance ==
The Catholic Church of St. Maria and Michael, Parpan Castle and the Wohnturm of the old Churwalden Abbey (a tower house) are listed as Swiss heritage sites of national significance.

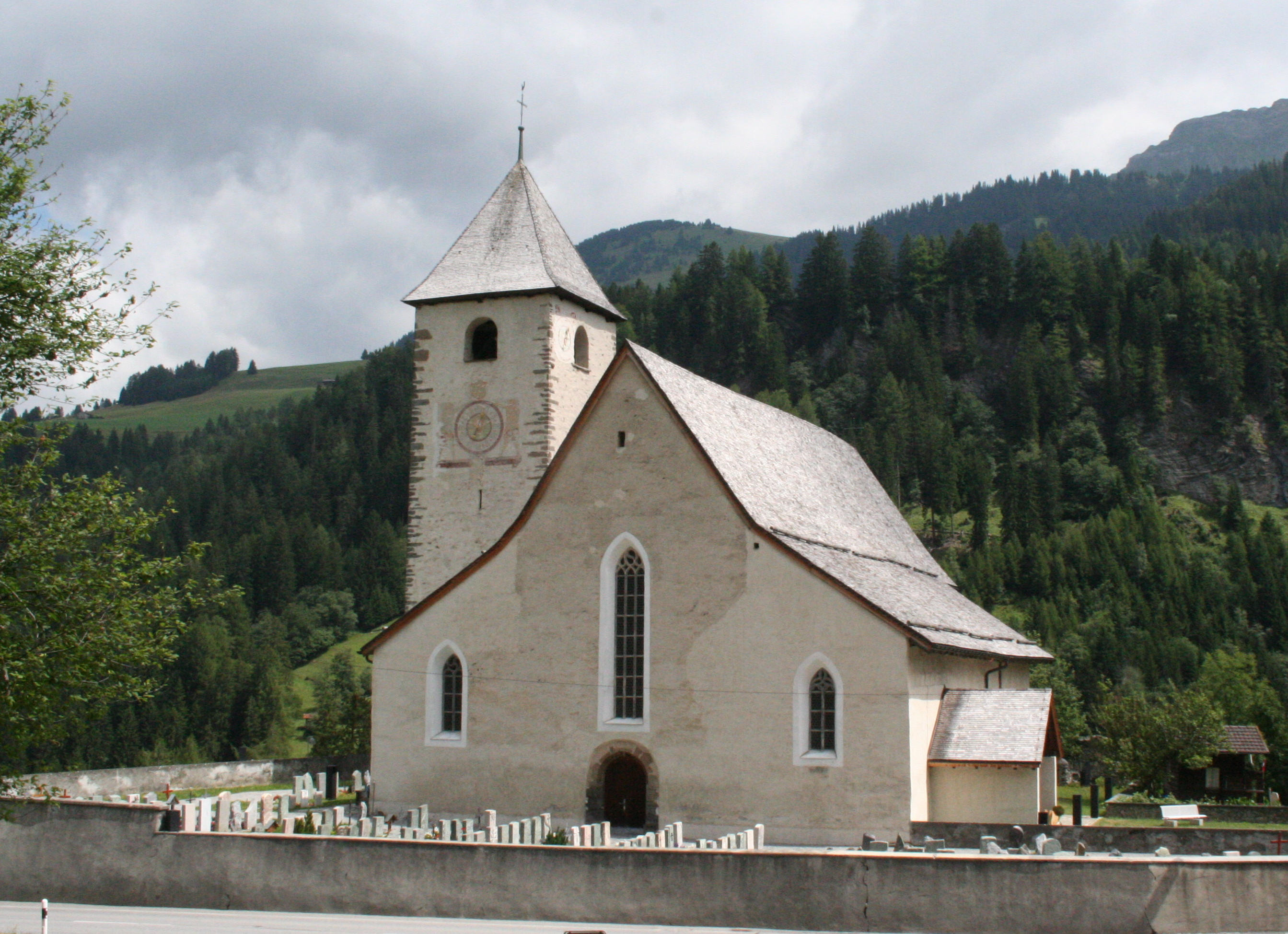
Church St. Maria and Michael

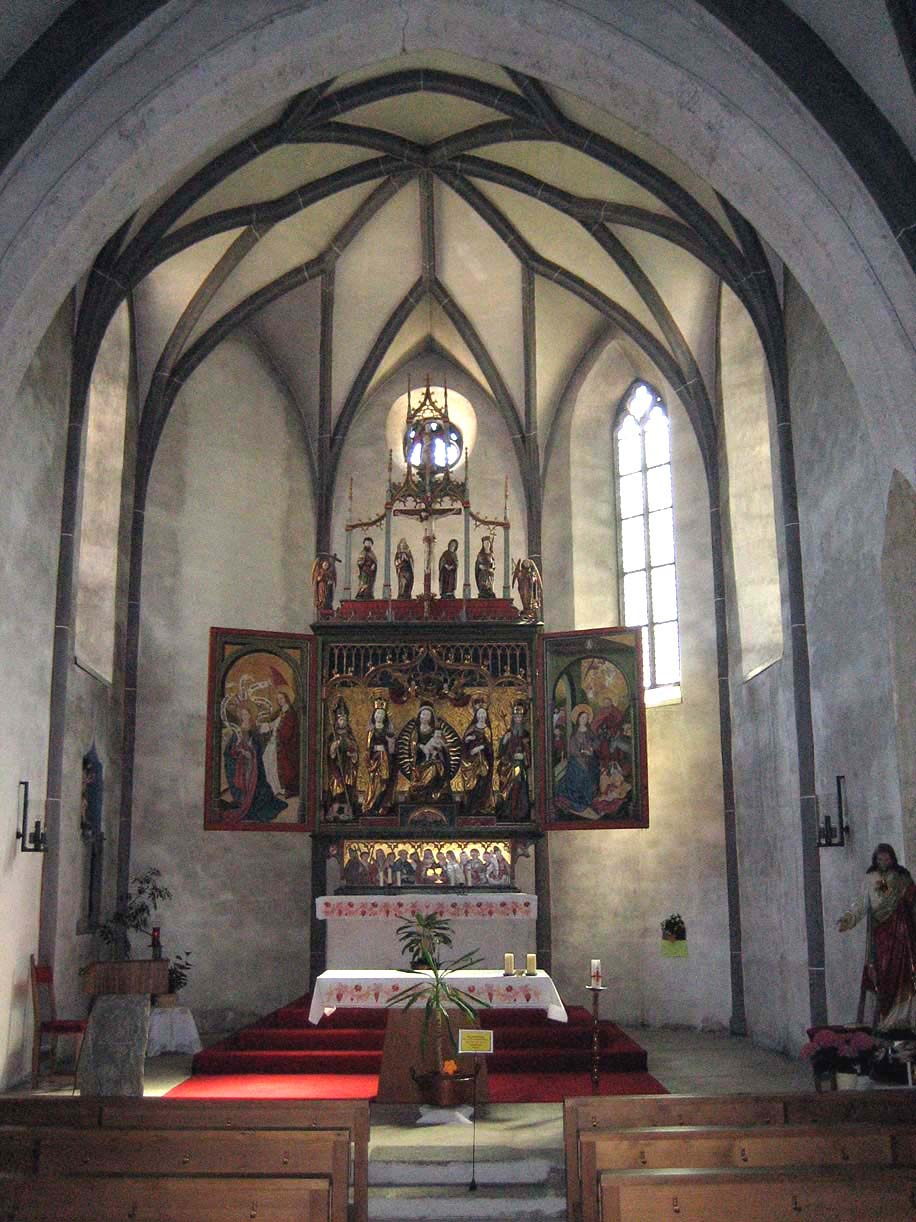
Choir of the church of St. Maria and Michael

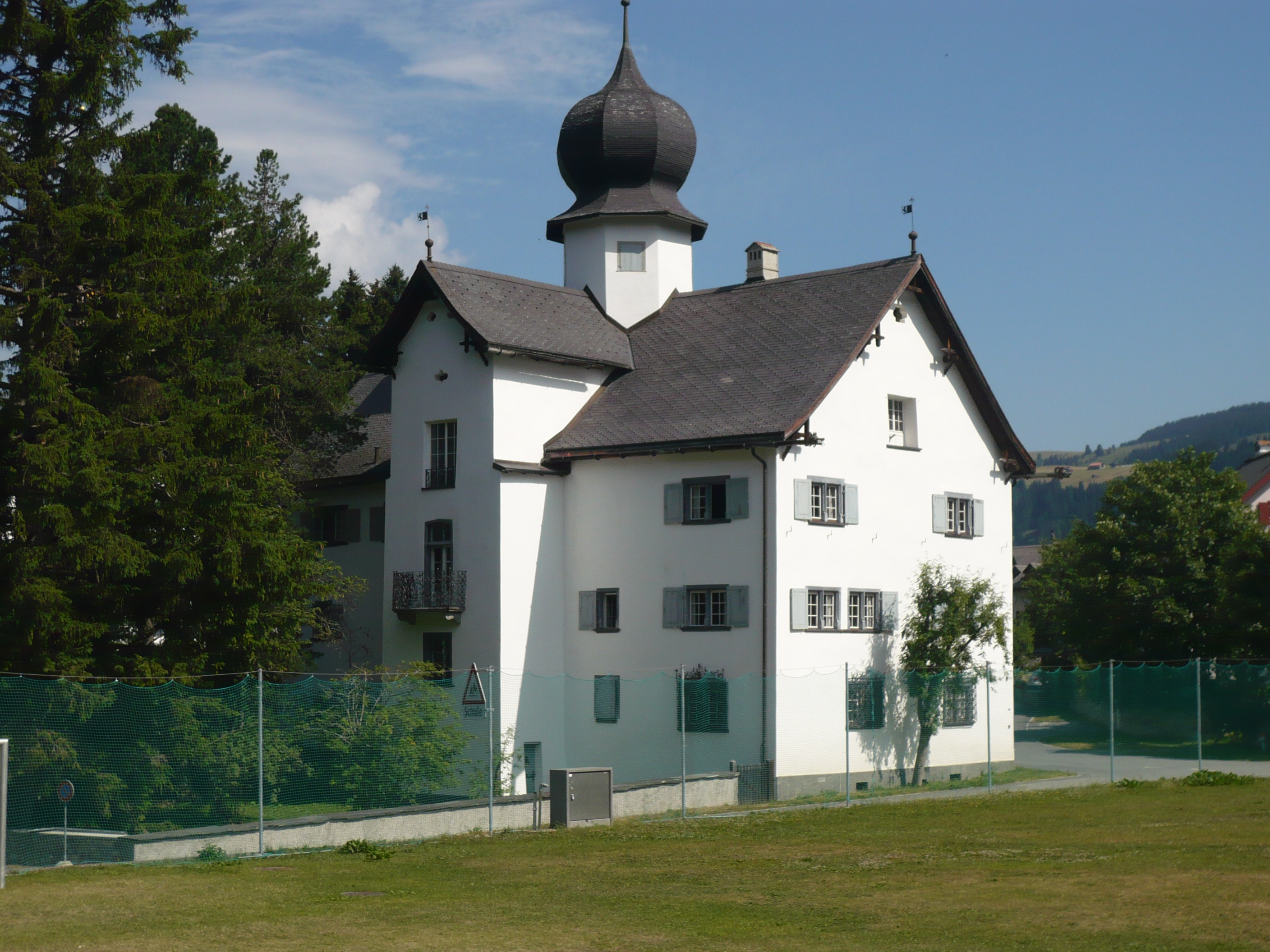
Parpan Castle

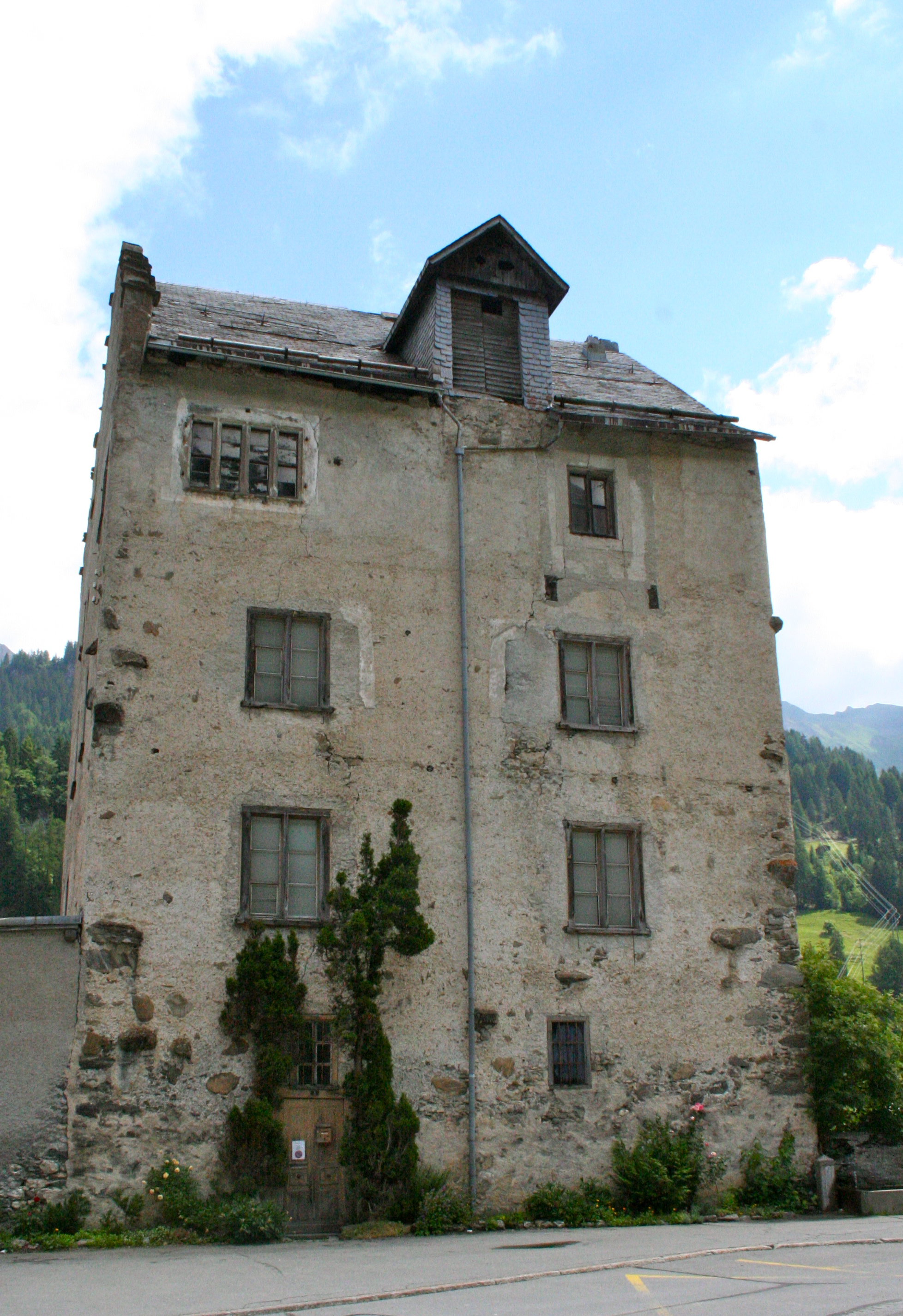
The Abbot's tower of Churwalden Abbey

== Politics ==
In the 2015 federal election the most popular party was the SVP with 30.4% of the vote. The next three most popular parties were the SP (18.4%), the FDP (16.9%) and the BDP (14.5%). In the federal election, a total of 665 votes were cast, and the voter turnout was 46.9%. The 2015 election saw a large change in the voting when compared to 2011. The percentage of the vote received by the SP increased from 13.2% in 2011 to 18.4% in 2015, the SVP increased from 23.8% to 30.4%, while the percentage that the received BDP dropped from 20.2% to 14.5%.

In the 2007 federal election the most popular party was the SVP which received 43.5% of the vote. The next three most popular parties were the SP (20.1%), the FDP (18%) and the CVP (17.6%).

== Education ==
In Churwalden about 64% of the population (between age 25-64) have completed either non-mandatory upper secondary education or additional higher education (either University or a Fachhochschule).

== Economy ==
Churwalden is a semi-touristic community.

As of 2014, there were a total of 862 people employed in the municipality. Of these, a total of 102 people worked in 40 businesses in the primary economic sector. The secondary sector employed 192 workers in 32 separate businesses. There were 7 small businesses with a total of 120 employees. Finally, the tertiary sector provided 568 jobs in 130 businesses. There were 7 small businesses with a total of 197 employees.

In 2015 a total of 6.3% of the population received social assistance. In 2011 the unemployment rate in the municipality was 1.7%.

In 2015 local hotels had a total of 37,210 overnight stays, of which 30.4% were international visitors.

In 2015 the average cantonal, municipal and church tax rate in the municipality for a couple with two children making SFr 80,000 was 3.5% while the rate for a single person making SFr 150,000 was 15.1%, both of which are close to the average for the canton. The canton's tax rate is close to the national average. In 2013 the average income in the municipality per tax payer was SFr 61,775 and the per person average was SFr 29,420, which is less than the cantonal average of SFr 69,964 and SFr 33,075 respectively as well as the national per tax payer average of SFr 82,682 and the per person average of SFr 35,825.

=== Businesses ===
The Grischuna Bündnerfleisch is produced in Churwalden.

== Religion ==
From the 2000 census, 483 or 39.1% were Roman Catholic, while 476 or 38.5% belonged to the Swiss Reformed Church. Of the rest of the population, there were 20 individuals (or about 1.62% of the population) who belonged to the Orthodox Church. There were 116 (or about 9.39% of the population) who are Muslim. There were 17 individuals (or about 1.38% of the population) who belonged to another church (not listed on the census), 89 (or about 7.20% of the population) belonged to no church and/or were agnostic or atheist, and 35 individuals (or about 2.83% of the population) did not answer the question.
