= Plessur Region =

Coordinates: 46.82°N 9.61°E

Plessur Region Region Plessur (German)
- District
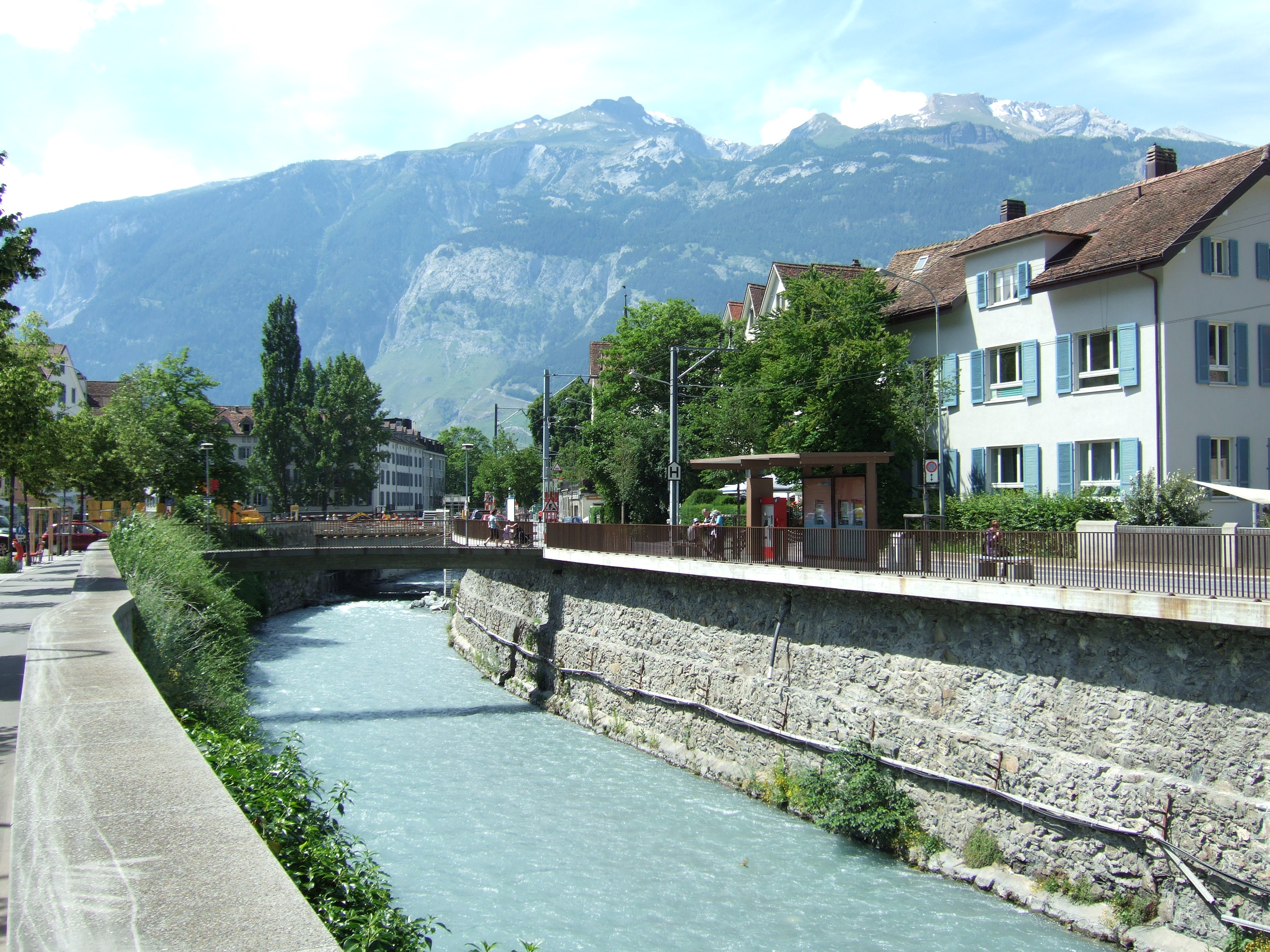
- Country: Switzerland
- Canton: Graubünden

Area
  - Total: 285.30 km^{2} (110.15 sq mi)

Population (2020)
  - Total: 42,822
  - Density: 150.09/km^{2} (388.74/sq mi)
- Time zone: UTC+1 (CET)
  - Summer (DST): UTC+2 (CEST)
- Municipalities: 3

The Plessur Region is one of the eleven administrative districts in the canton of Graubünden in Switzerland. It had an area of 285.30 square kilometers (110.15 sq mi) and a population of 42,822 (as of 31 December 2020). It was created on 1 January 2017 as part of a reorganization of the Canton.

== Municipalities ==
Municipalities in the Plessur Region
Municipality	Population (31 December 2020)	Area (km^{2})
Chur	36,336	54.33
Churwalden	1,936	48.53
Arosa	3,162	154.79

== Mergers ==
- On 1 January 2020 the former municipality of Maladers merged into Chur.
- On 1 January 2021 the former municipality of Haldenstein merged into Chur.
- On 1 January 2025 the former municipality of Tschiertschen-Praden merged into Chur.
