= Castiel, Switzerland =

Castiel
- Former municipality
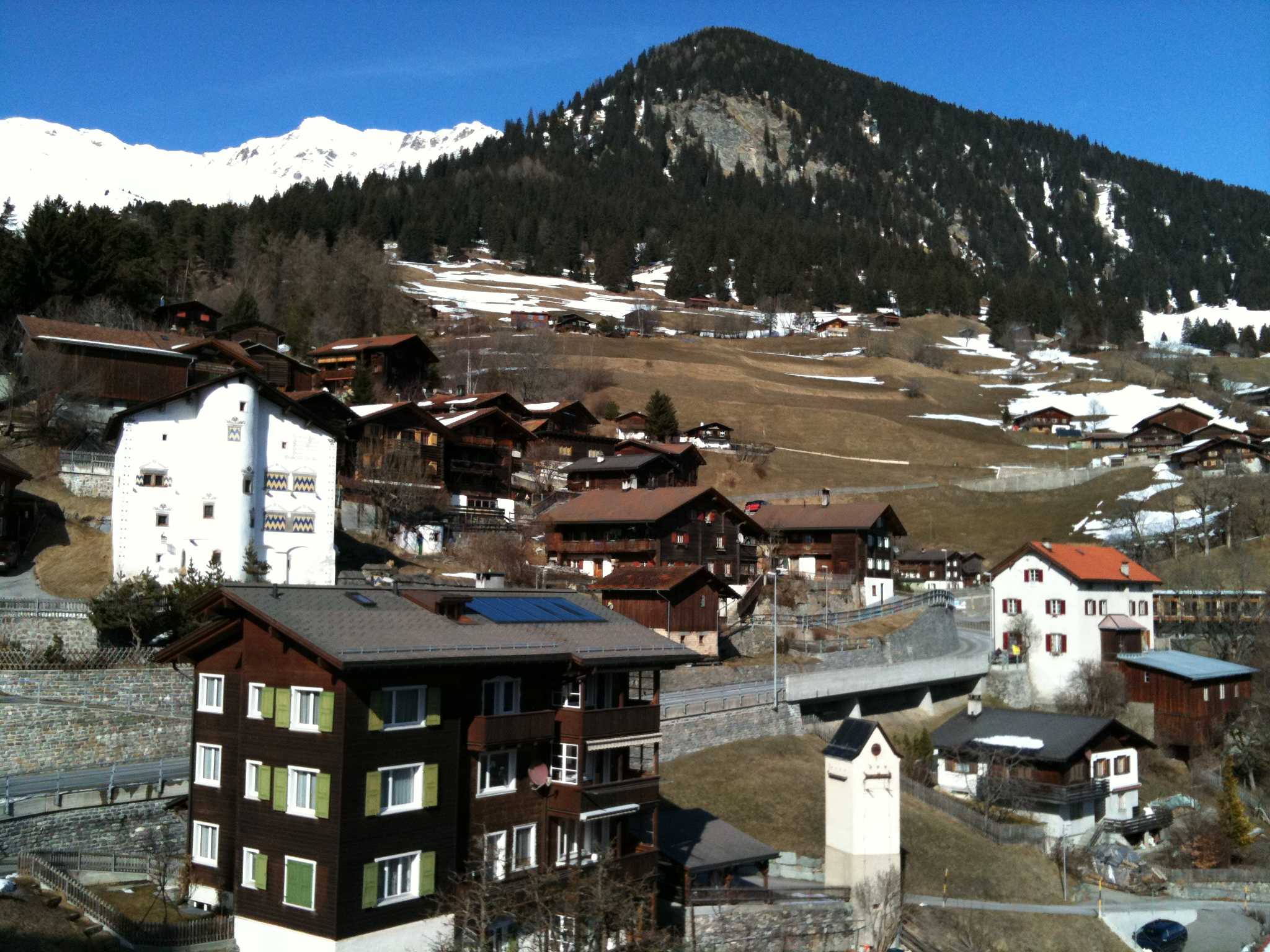
- Castiel village

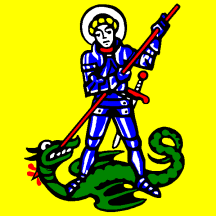
- Flag Coat of arms
- Location of Castiel
- Location within Switzerland Location within Canton of Graubünden
- Coordinates: 46°50′N 9°36′E
- Country: Switzerland
- Canton: Graubünden
- District: Plessur

Area
  - Total: 5.41 km^{2} (2.09 sq mi)
- Elevation: 1,174 m (3,852 ft)

Population (2010)
  - Total: 128
  - Density: 23.7/km^{2} (61.3/sq mi)
- Time zone: UTC+01:00 (CET)
  - Summer (DST): UTC+02:00 (CEST)
- Postal code: 7027
- SFOS number: 3923
- ISO 3166 code: CH-GR
- Surrounded by: Calfreisen, Lüen, St. Peter-Pagig, Praden, Says, Trimmis
- Website: SFSO statistics

Castiel ([kɐˈʃtiə̯l]) is a former municipality in the district of Plessur in the canton of Graubünden in Switzerland. On 1 January 2013 the former municipalities of Castiel, Calfreisen, Langwies, Lüen, Molinis, Peist and St. Peter-Pagig merged into the municipality of Arosa.

== History ==
Castiel is first mentioned in 1132 as Castellum.

== Geography ==
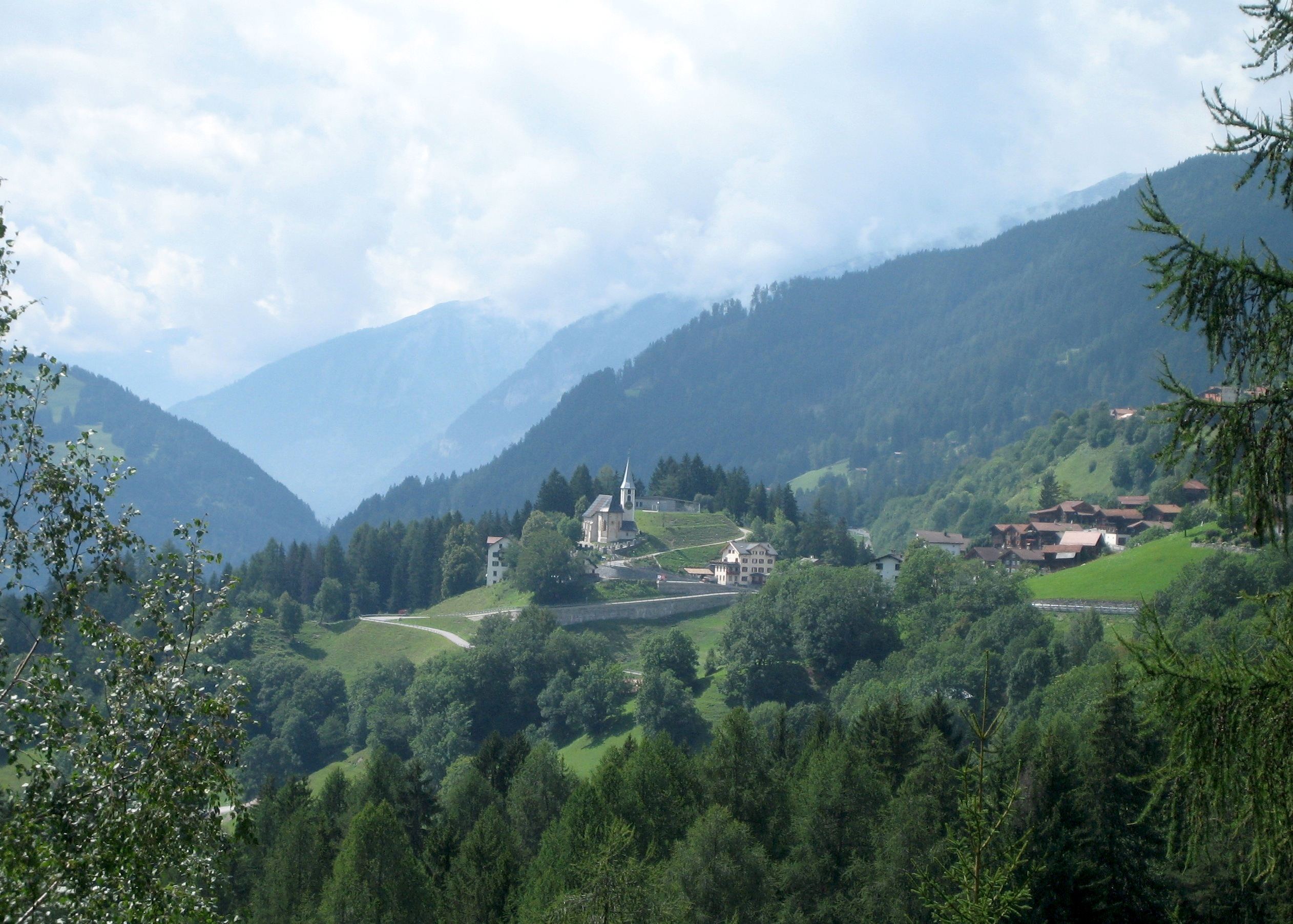
View of Castiel and surrounding mountains

Before the merger, Castiel had a total area of 5.4 km^{2} (2.1 mi^{2}). Of this area, 43.1% is used for agricultural purposes, while 49.2% is forested. Of the rest of the land, 1.8% is settled (buildings or roads) and the remainder (5.9%) is non-productive (rivers, glaciers or mountains).

The former municipality is located in the Schanfigg sub-district of the Plessur district on the northern face of the Schanfigg. It consists of the village of Castiel with the two sections of Oberdorf and Unterdorf.

Nearby, in Lüen, is the Lüen-Castiel railway station, on the Chur-Arosa railway line.

== Demographics ==
Castiel had a population (as of 2010) of 128. As of 2008, 6.5% of the population was made up of foreign nationals. Over the last 10 years the population has decreased at a rate of -2.4%. Most of the population (as of 2000) speaks German (97.5%), with the rest speaking Romansh (2.5%).

As of 2000, the gender distribution of the population was 48.0% male and 52.0% female. The age distribution, as of 2000, in Castiel is; 24 children or 20.2% of the population are between 0 and 9 years old. 8 teenagers or 6.7% are 10 to 14, and 4 teenagers or 3.4% are 15 to 19. Of the adult population, 4 people or 3.4% of the population are between 20 and 29 years old. 26 people or 21.8% are 30 to 39, 18 people or 15.1% are 40 to 49, and 13 people or 10.9% are 50 to 59. The senior population distribution is 9 people or 7.6% of the population are between 60 and 69 years old, 8 people or 6.7% are 70 to 79, there are 5 people or 4.2% who are 80 to 89.

In the 2007 federal election the most popular party was the SVP which received 54.1% of the vote. The next three most popular parties were the SP (23.9%), the FDP (20.8%) and the CVP (1.3%).

The entire Swiss population is generally well educated. In Castiel about 70.5% of the population (between age 25–64) have completed either non-mandatory upper secondary education or additional higher education (either University or a Fachhochschule).

Castiel has an unemployment rate of 0.56%. As of 2005, there were 20 people employed in the primary economic sector and about 8 businesses involved in this sector. 5 people are employed in the secondary sector and there is 1 business in this sector. 4 people are employed in the tertiary sector, with 3 businesses in this sector.

The historical population is given in the following table:

year	population
1808	54
1850	72
1880	126
1900	90
1950	92
1960	82
1970	94
1980	83
1990	109
2000	119
2008	124
2010	128

== Heritage sites of national significance ==
The archeological site of Carschlingg, a prehistoric, late-Roman and Early Middle Ages settlement is listed as a Swiss heritage site of national significance.
