= Calfreisen =

- Former municipality
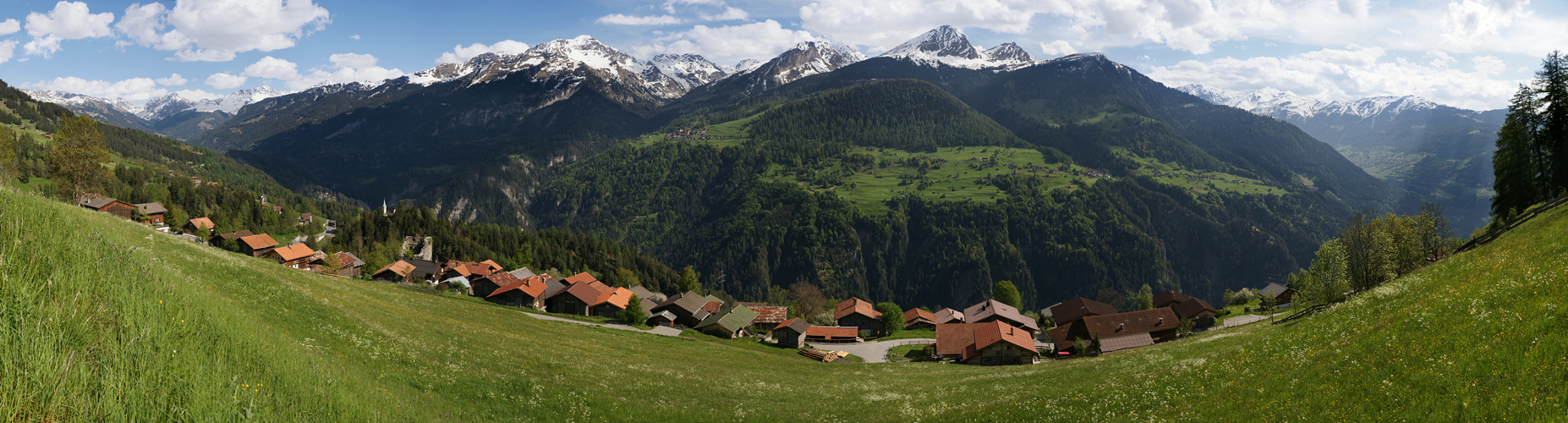
- Calfreisen, on southern end is Ruine Bernegg and further down in the valley is Castiel church.

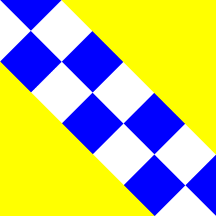
- Flag Coat of arms
- Location of Calfreisen
- Location within Switzerland Location within Canton of Graubünden
- Coordinates: 46°50′N 9°35′E
- Country: Switzerland
- Canton: Graubünden
- District: Plessur

Area
  - Total: 5.17 km^{2} (2.00 sq mi)
- Elevation: 1,249 m (4,098 ft)

Population (2010)
  - Total: 54
  - Density: 10/km^{2} (27/sq mi)
- Time zone: UTC+01:00 (CET)
  - Summer (DST): UTC+02:00 (CEST)
- Postal code: 7027
- SFOS number: 3922
- ISO 3166 code: CH-GR
- Surrounded by: Castiel, Maladers, Praden, Says, Trimmis
- Website: www.calfreisen.ch

Calfreisen (Romansh: Chiaunreis) is a former municipality in the district of Plessur in the canton of Graubünden in Switzerland. On 1 January 2013 the former municipalities of Calfreisen, Castiel, Langwies, Lüen, Molinis, Peist and St. Peter-Pagig merged into the municipality of Arosa.

== History ==
Calfreisen is first mentioned in 1156 as Caureisene.

== Geography ==
Before the merger, Calfreisen had a total area of 5.2 km^{2} (2.0 mi^{2}). Of this area, 49.5% is used for agricultural purposes, while 30% is forested. Of the rest of the land, 1.7% is settled (buildings or roads) and the remainder (18.8%) is non-productive (rivers, glaciers or mountains).

The former municipality is located in the Schanfigg sub-district of the Plessur district. It is on the north slope of the Schanfigg mountain.

== Demographics ==
Calfreisen had a population (as of 2010) of 54. As of 2008, 20.4% of the population was made up of foreign nationals. Over the last 10 years the population has grown at a rate of 12.5%.

As of 2000, the gender distribution of the population was 55.6% male and 44.4% female. The age distribution, as of 2000, in Calfreisen is; 7 children or 15.6% of the population are between 0 and 9 years old. 4 teenagers or 8.9% are 10 to 14, and 1 teenager is 15 to 19. Of the adult population, 2 people or 4.4% of the population are between 20 and 29 years old. 6 people or 13.3% are 30 to 39, 8 people or 17.8% are 40 to 49, and 6 people or 13.3% are 50 to 59. The senior population distribution is 1 person is between 60 and 69 years old, 3 people or 6.7% are 70 to 79, there are 7 people or 15.6% who are 80 to 89.

In the 2007 federal election the most popular party was the SVP which received 63.3% of the vote. The next three most popular parties were the SP (28.3%), the CVP (5%) and the FDP (3.3%).

In Calfreisen about 77.3% of the population (between age 25–64) have completed either non-mandatory upper secondary education or additional higher education (either University or a Fachhochschule).

Calfreisen has an unemployment rate of 0.4%. As of 2005, there were 6 people employed in the primary economic sector and about 3 businesses involved in this sector. 1 person is employed in the secondary sector and there is 1 business in this sector. 1 person is employed in the tertiary sector, with 1 business in this sector.

The historical population is given in the following table:

year	population
1808	57
1850	98
1900	58
1950	60
1980	34
2000	45

== Languages ==
Most of the population (as of 2000) speaks German (93.3%), with the rest speaking Romansh ( 6.7%).

The historical language use is given in the following table:

Languages in Calfreisen
Languages	Census 1980		Census 1990		Census 2000	
Languages	Number	Percent	Number	Percent	Number	Percent
German	32	94.12%	53	98.15%	42	93.33%
Romansh	2	5.88%	0	0.00%	3	6.67%
Population	34	100%	54	100%	45	100%
