= Maladers =

- Former municipality
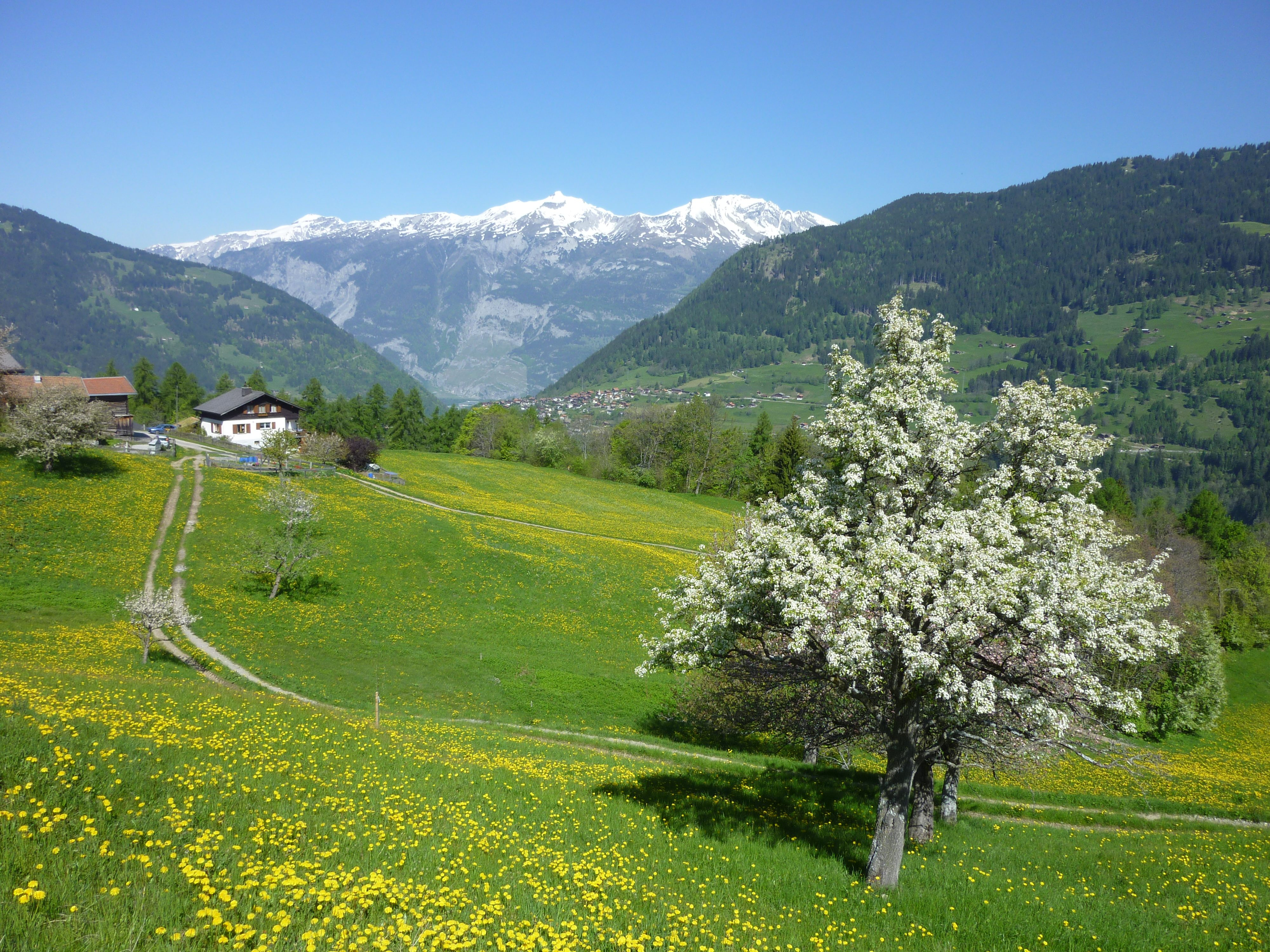
- Fields outside Maladers village

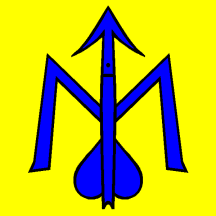
- Flag Coat of arms
- Location of Maladers
- Location within Switzerland Location within Canton of Graubünden
- Coordinates: 46°50′N 9°33′E
- Country: Switzerland
- Canton: Graubünden
- District: Plessur

Area
  - Total: 7.61 km^{2} (2.94 sq mi)
- Elevation: 1,000 m (3,300 ft)

Population (December 2020)
  - Total: 519
  - Density: 68.2/km^{2} (177/sq mi)
- Time zone: UTC+01:00 (CET)
  - Summer (DST): UTC+02:00 (CEST)
- Postal code: 7026
- SFOS number: 3926
- ISO 3166 code: CH-GR
- Surrounded by: Calfreisen, Churwalden, Chur, Praden, Trimmis
- Website: SFSO statistics

Maladers is a former municipality in the Plessur Region in the canton of Graubünden in Switzerland. On 1 January 2020 the former municipality of Maladers merged into Chur.

== History ==
Maladers is first mentioned in 1156 as de Maladru.

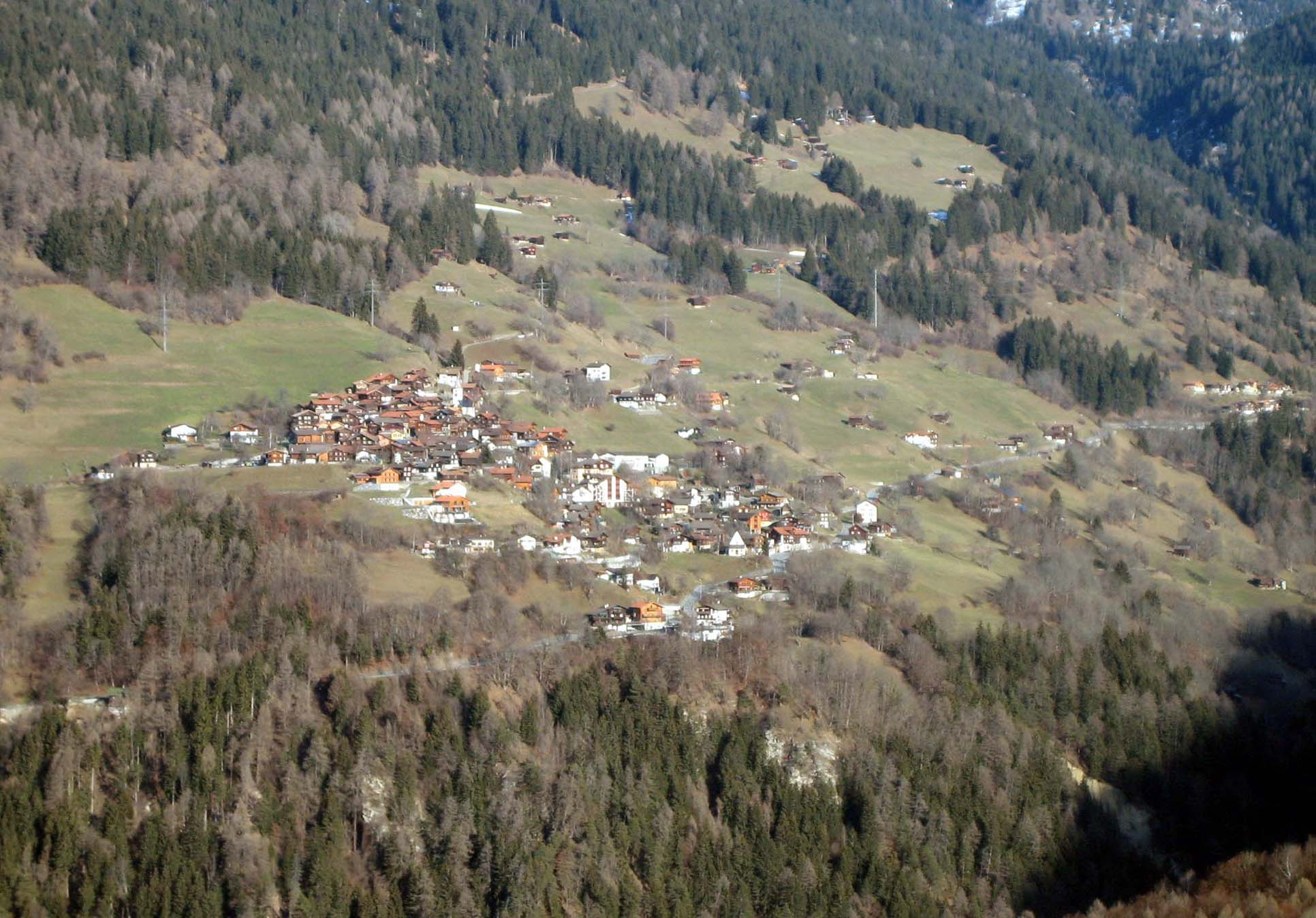
Maladers village from the air

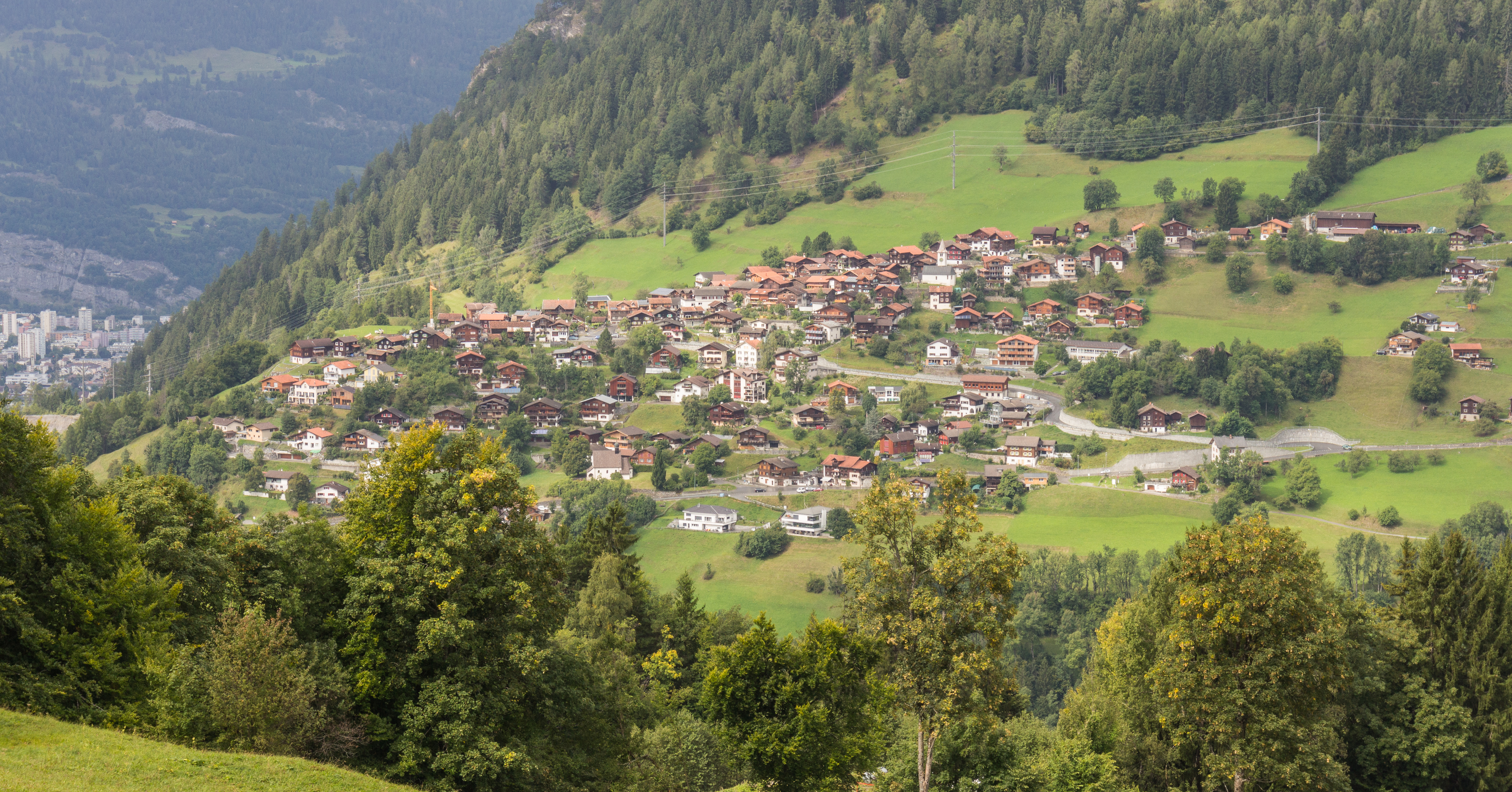
View of Maladers.

== Geography ==
Aerial view (1947)

Maladers has an area, (as of the 2004/09 survey) of 7.59 km^{2} (2.93 sq mi). Of this area, about 28.1% is used for agricultural purposes, while 63.7% is forested. Of the rest of the land, 4.2% is settled (buildings or roads) and 3.9% is unproductive land. In the 2004/09 survey a total of 14 ha (35 acres) or about 1.8% of the total area was covered with buildings, an increase of 2 ha (4.9 acres) over the 1985 amount. Of the agricultural land, 1 ha (2.5 acres) is used for orchards and vineyards, 94 ha (230 acres) is fields and grasslands and 206 ha (510 acres) consists of alpine grazing areas. Since 1985 the amount of agricultural land has decreased by 45 ha (110 acres). Over the same time period the amount of forested land has increased by 48 ha (120 acres). Rivers and lakes cover 4 ha (9.9 acres) in the municipality.

Before 2017, the municipality was located in the Schanfigg sub-district of the Plessur district at the entrance to the Schanfiggs valley. It consists of the haufendorf village (an irregular, unplanned and quite closely packed village, built around a central square) of Maladers and the hamlets of Sax and Brandacker.

== Demographics ==
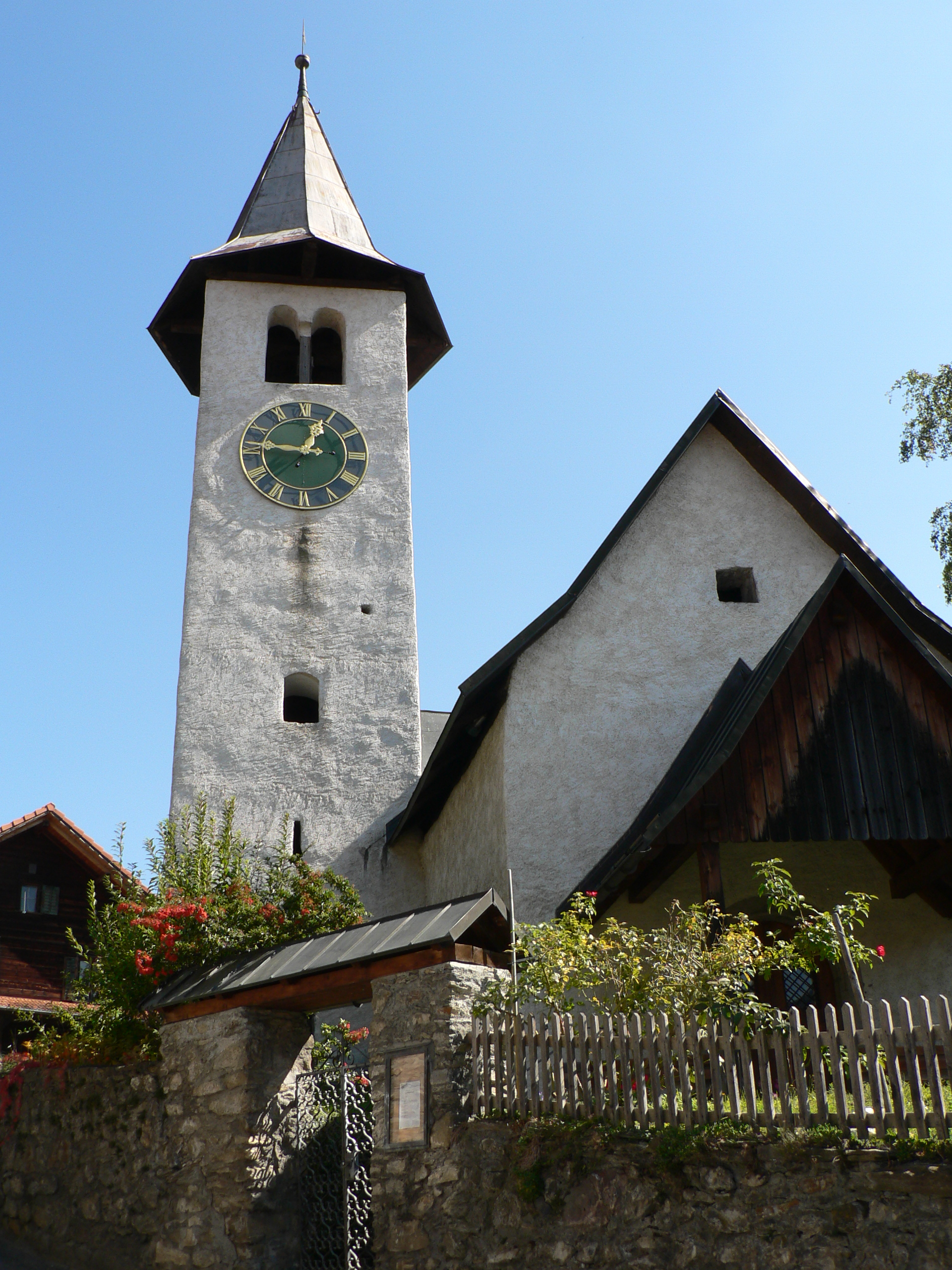
Reformed church of Maladers

Maladers has a population (as of December 2020) of 519. As of 2015, 8.5% of the population are resident foreign nationals. Over the last 5 years (2010–2015) the population has changed at a rate of 1.81%. The birth rate in the municipality, in 2015, was 9.9, while the death rate was 5.9 per thousand residents.

As of 2015, children and teenagers (0–19 years old) make up 15.4% of the population, while adults (20–64 years old) are 64.2% of the population and seniors (over 64 years old) make up 20.4%. In 2015 there were 192 single residents, 246 people who were married or in a civil partnership, 26 widows or widowers and 42 divorced residents.

In 2015 there were 233 private households in Maladers with an average household size of 2.15 persons. In 2015 about 67.9% of all buildings in the municipality were single family homes. Of the 189 inhabited buildings in the municipality, in 2000, about 67.2% were single family homes and 16.9% were multiple family buildings. Additionally, about 33.9% of the buildings were built before 1919, while 12.7% were built between 1991 and 2000. In 2014 the rate of construction of new housing units per 1000 residents was 0.0%. The vacancy rate for the municipality, in 2016, was 2.47%.

Most of the population (as of 2000) speaks German (95.5%), with Romansh being second most common ( 2.2%) and Italian being third ( 1.0%).

The historical population is given in the following chart:

== Politics ==
In the 2015 federal election the most popular party was the SVP with 51.2% of the vote. The next three most popular parties were the SP (16.0%), the BDP (14.4%) and the GLP (11.4%). In the federal election, a total of 165 votes were cast, and the voter turnout was 39.3%. The 2015 election saw a large change in the voting when compared to 2011, though this may be unsurprising considering the small number of voters. The percentage of the vote received by the SVP increased sharply from 31.5% in 2011 to 51.2% in 2015, while the percentage that the BDP dropped from 21.8% to 14.4%.

In the 2007 federal election the most popular party was the SVP which received 51.8% of the vote. The next three most popular parties were the SP (28.1%), the FDP (8.5%) and the CVP (6.2%).

== Education ==
In Maladers about 72.9% of the population (between age 25–64) have completed either non-mandatory upper secondary education or additional higher education (either university or a Fachhochschule).

== Economy ==
Maladers is classed as a bedroom community with few new residents. The municipality is part of the agglomeration of Chur.

As of 2014, there were a total of 88 people employed in the municipality. Of these, a total of 22 people worked in 11 businesses in the primary economic sector. The secondary sector employed 34 workers in 13 separate businesses. Finally, the tertiary sector provided 32 jobs in 15 businesses. In 2011 the unemployment rate in the municipality was 1.6%.

In 2015 the average cantonal, municipal and church tax rate in the municipality for a couple with two children making SFr 80,000 was 3.9% while the rate for a single person making SFr 150,000 was 16.7%, both of which are close to the average for the canton and nationally. In 2013 the average income in the municipality per tax payer was SFr 62,336 and the per person average was SFr 28,988, which is less than the cantonal average of SFr 69,964 and SFr 33,075 respectively and the national per tax payer average of SFr 82,682 and the per person average of SFr 35,825.
