= Tschiertschen =

- Former municipality
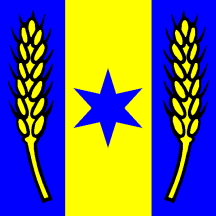
- Flag Coat of arms
- Location of Tschiertschen
- Location within Switzerland Location within Canton of Graubünden
- Coordinates: 46°49′N 9°36′E
- Country: Switzerland
- Canton: Graubünden
- District: Plessur

Area
  - Total: 21.39 km^{2} (8.26 sq mi)
- Elevation: 1,350 m (4,430 ft)

Population (December 2008)
  - Total: 208
  - Density: 9.72/km^{2} (25.2/sq mi)
- Time zone: UTC+01:00 (CET)
  - Summer (DST): UTC+02:00 (CEST)
- Postal code: 7064
- SFOS number: 3915
- ISO 3166 code: CH-GR
- Website: SFSO statistics

Tschiertschen is a village in the municipality of Tschiertschen-Praden in the district of Plessur in the canton of Graubünden in Switzerland.

The formerly independent municipality merged with Praden to form Tschiertschen-Praden on January 1, 2009.

== History ==
Tschiertschen is first mentioned around the end of the 8th Century as in Cercene.

== Geography ==
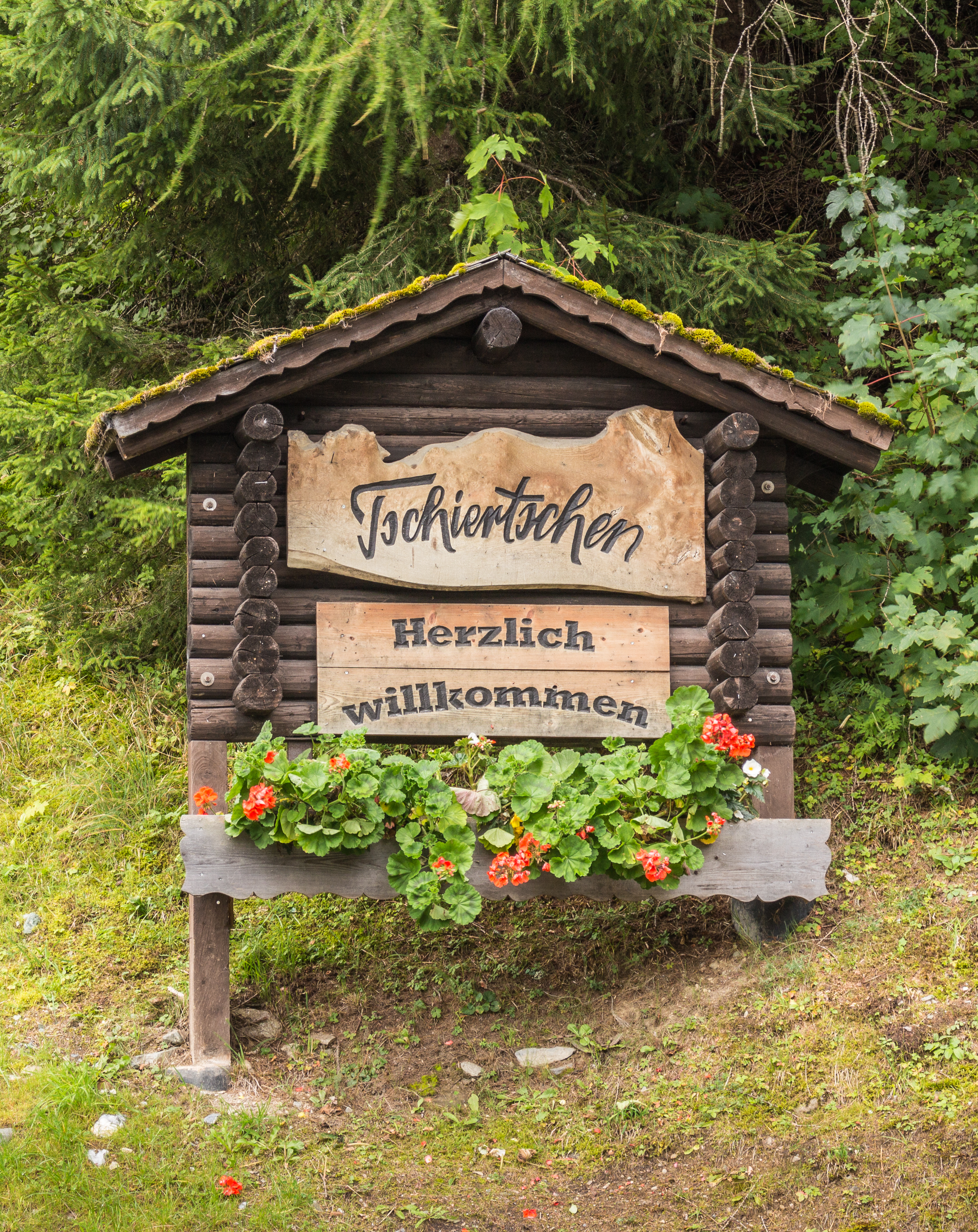
Welcome to Tschiertschen.

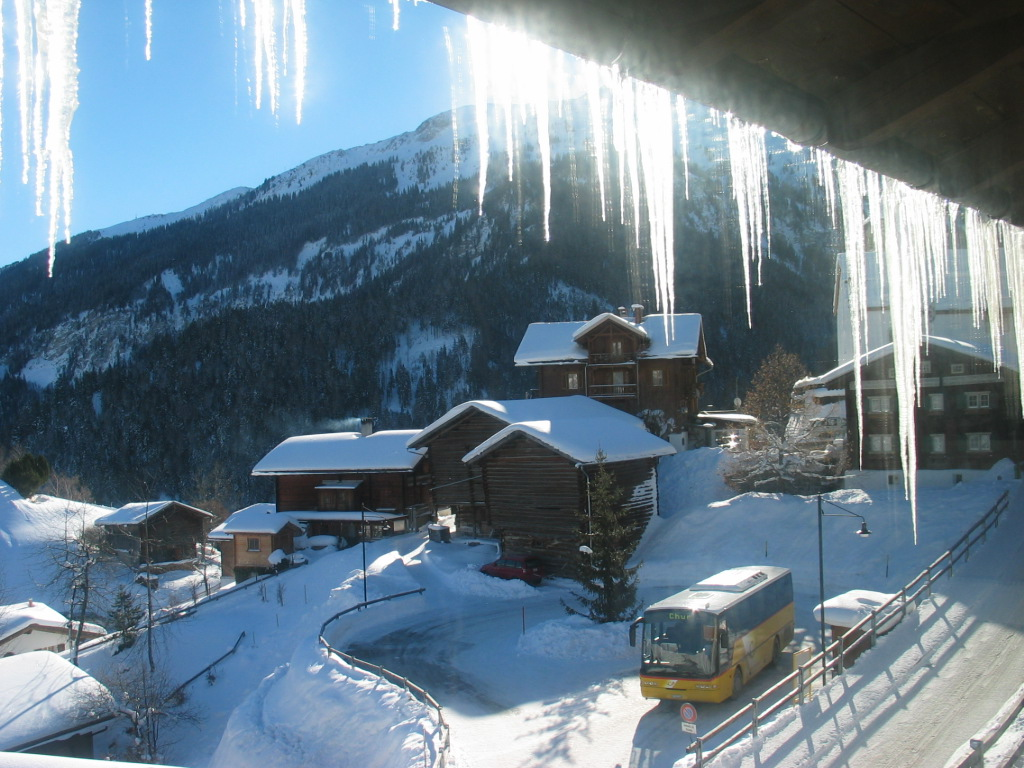
Tschiertschen village center in winter

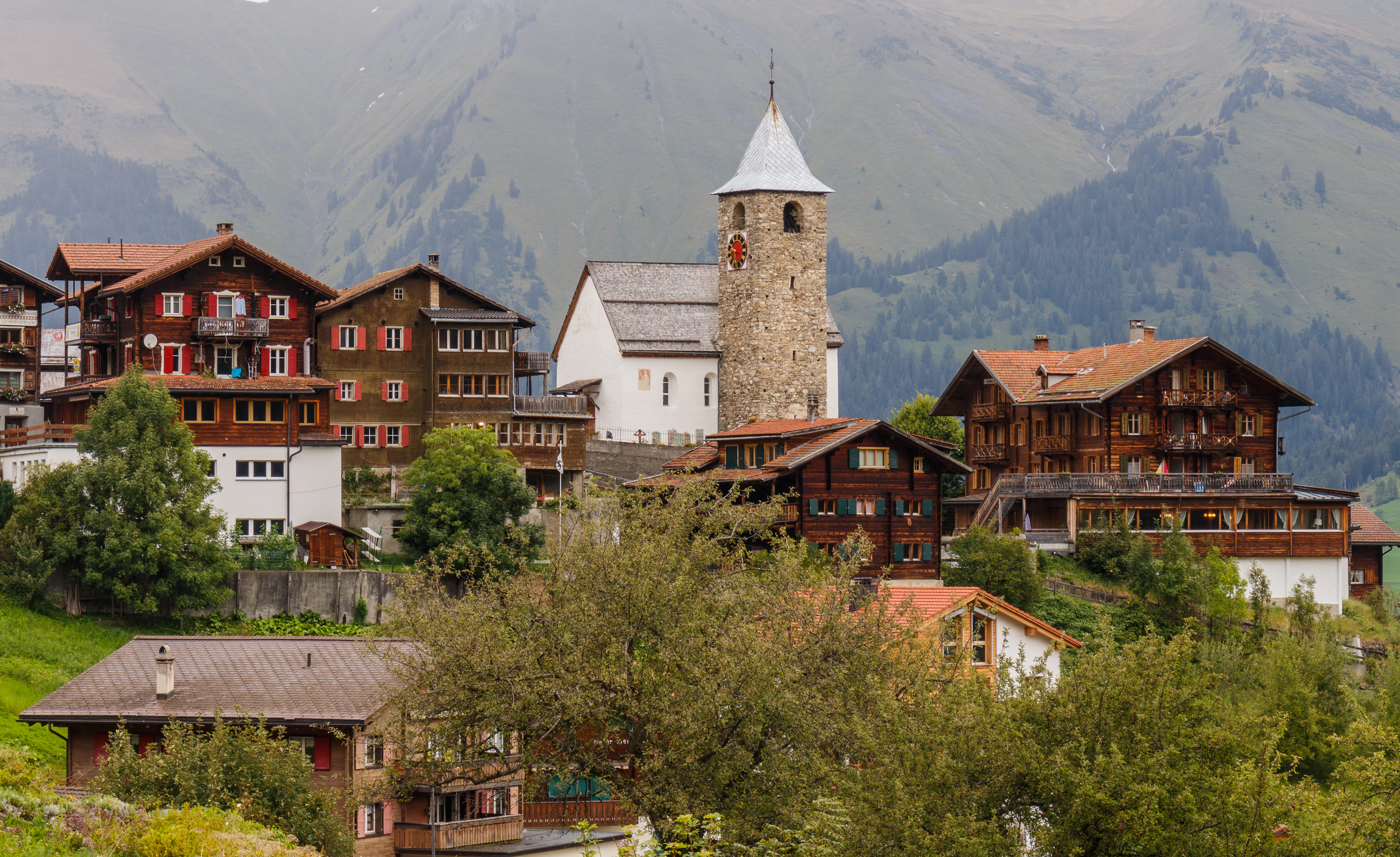
Tschiertschen (1350 meter).

Aerial view (1949)

Tschiertschen has an area, as of 2006, of 21.4 km^{2} (8.3 sq mi). Of this area, 52.6% is used for agricultural purposes, while 22.6% is forested. Of the rest of the land, 1.4% is settled (buildings or roads) and the remainder (23.4%) is non-productive (rivers, glaciers or mountains).

The village is located in the Churwalden sub-district of the Plessur district on the mountain slopes above the left side of the Schanfigger valley. It consists of the haufendorf village (an irregular, unplanned and quite closely packed village, built around a central square) of Tschiertschen at an elevation of 1,351 m (4,432 ft). It merged with Praden to form Tschiertschen-Praden on January 1, 2009.

== Demographics ==
Tschiertschen has a population (as of 2008) of 208, of which 13.5% are foreign nationals. Over the last 10 years the population has decreased at a rate of -12.8%. Most of the population (as of 2000) speaks German (96.0%), with Serbo-Croatian being second most common ( 1.3%) and Italian being third ( 0.9%).

As of 2000, the gender distribution of the population was 48.1% male and 51.9% female. The age distribution, as of 2000, in Tschiertschen is; 12 children or 5.3% of the population are between 0 and 9 years old. 25 teenagers or 11.1% are 10 to 14, and 12 teenagers or 5.3% are 15 to 19. Of the adult population, 22 people or 9.8% of the population are between 20 and 29 years old. 26 people or 11.6% are 30 to 39, 40 people or 17.8% are 40 to 49, and 37 people or 16.4% are 50 to 59. The senior population distribution is 22 people or 9.8% of the population are between 60 and 69 years old, 20 people or 8.9% are 70 to 79, there are 9 people or 4.0% who are 80 to 89.

In the 2007 federal election the most popular party was the SVP which received 59.7% of the vote. The next three most popular parties were the SP (20%), the FDP (10.2%) and the CVP (8.6%).

The entire Swiss population is generally well educated. In Tschiertschen about 76.3% of the population (between age 25-64) have completed either non-mandatory upper secondary education or additional higher education (either University or a Fachhochschule).

Tschiertschen has an unemployment rate of 1.79%. As of 2005, there were 15 people employed in the primary economic sector and about 6 businesses involved in this sector. 14 people are employed in the secondary sector and there are 4 businesses in this sector. 47 people are employed in the tertiary sector, with 19 businesses in this sector.

The historical population is given in the following table:

year	population
1803	130
1850	124
1870	160
1900	139
1950	174
2000	225

== Wood Sawmill Sagi Tschiertschen ==
Sawmill Sagi Tschiertschen is powered by the waters of the Sagabachs. The sawmill was built in 1920 and renovated in 1989.
Demonstrations May–September.

== Photo gallery sawmill Sagi Tschiertschen ==
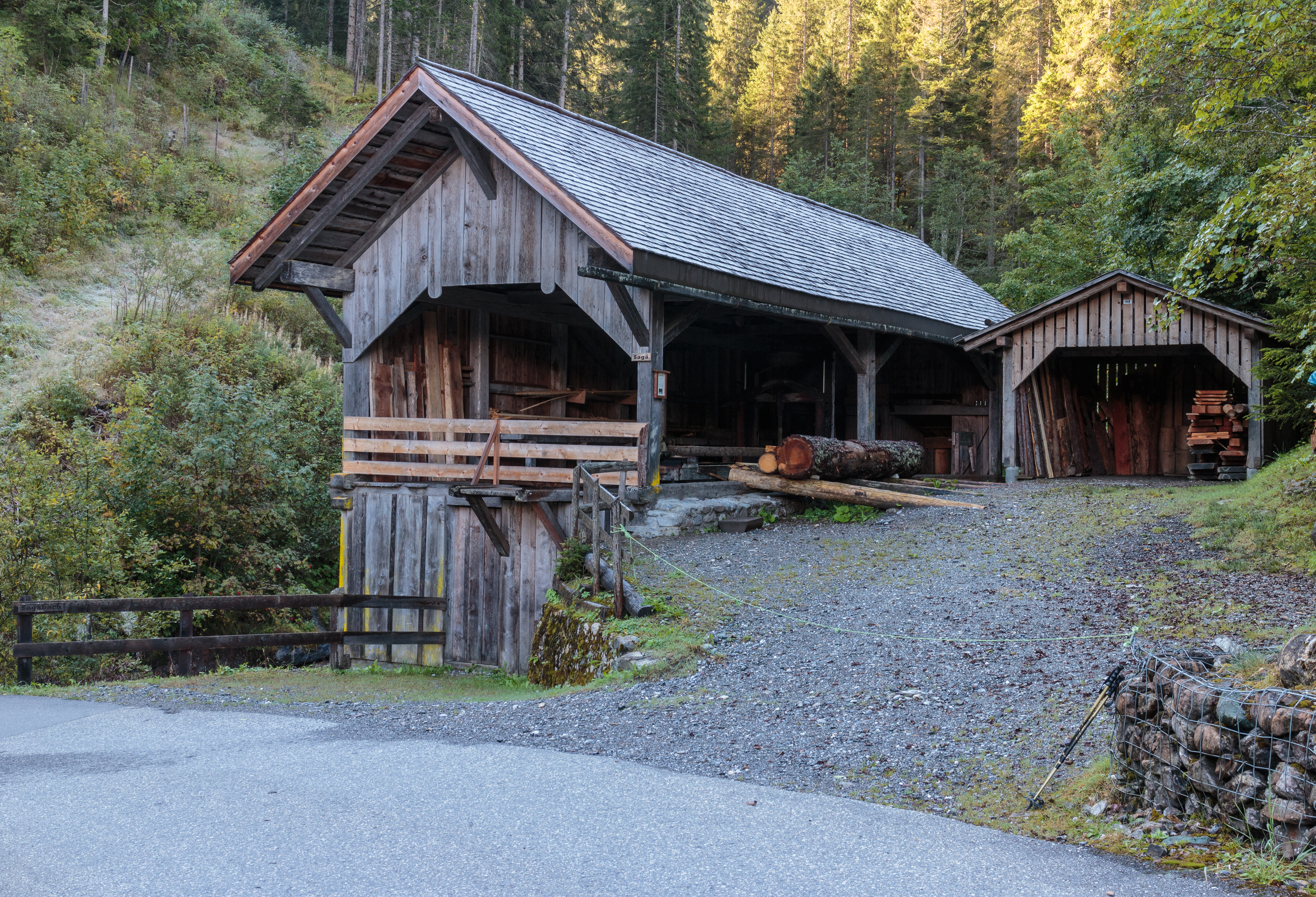
Building.

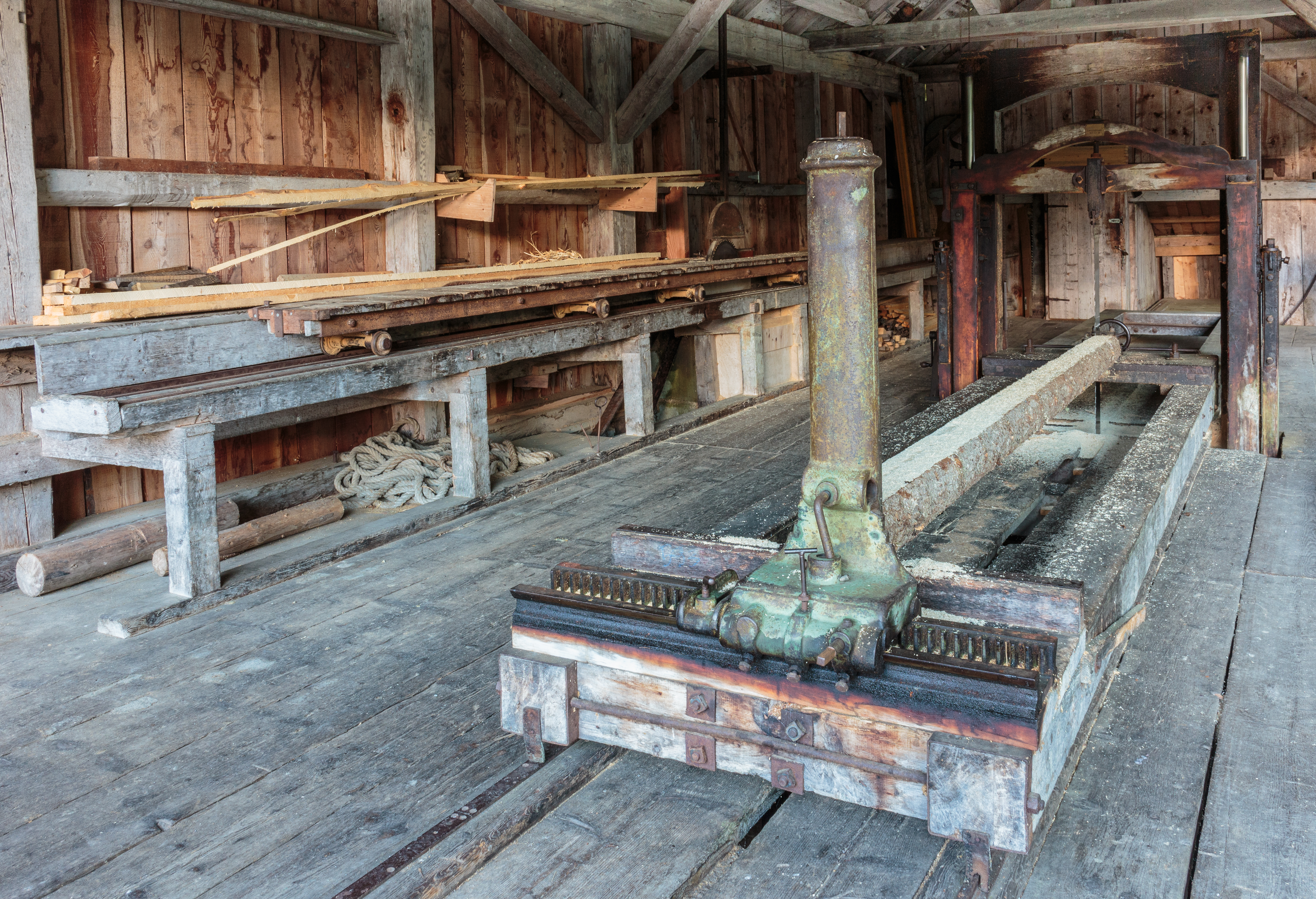
Wood sawing machine.

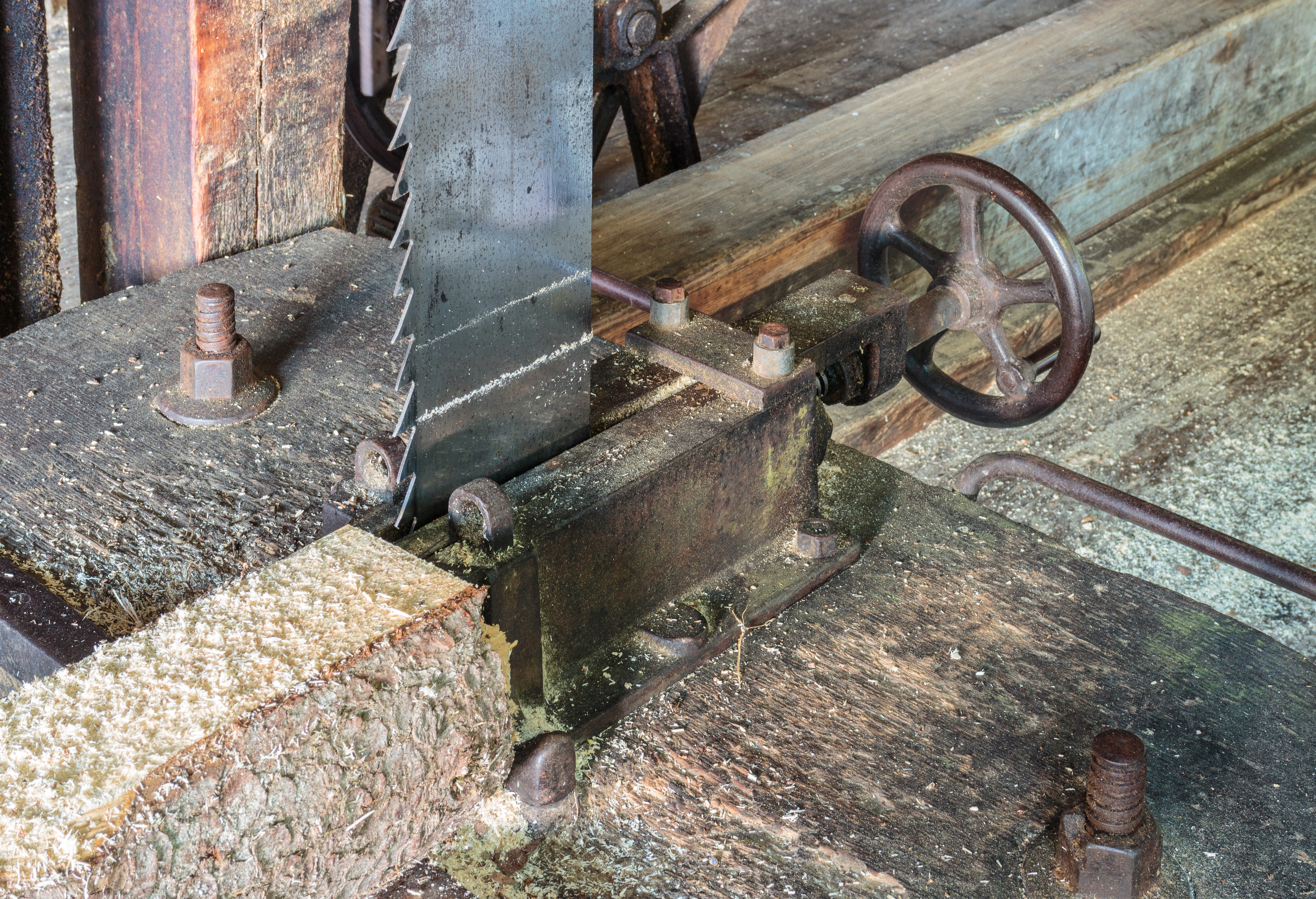
Wood sawing machine. Detail.

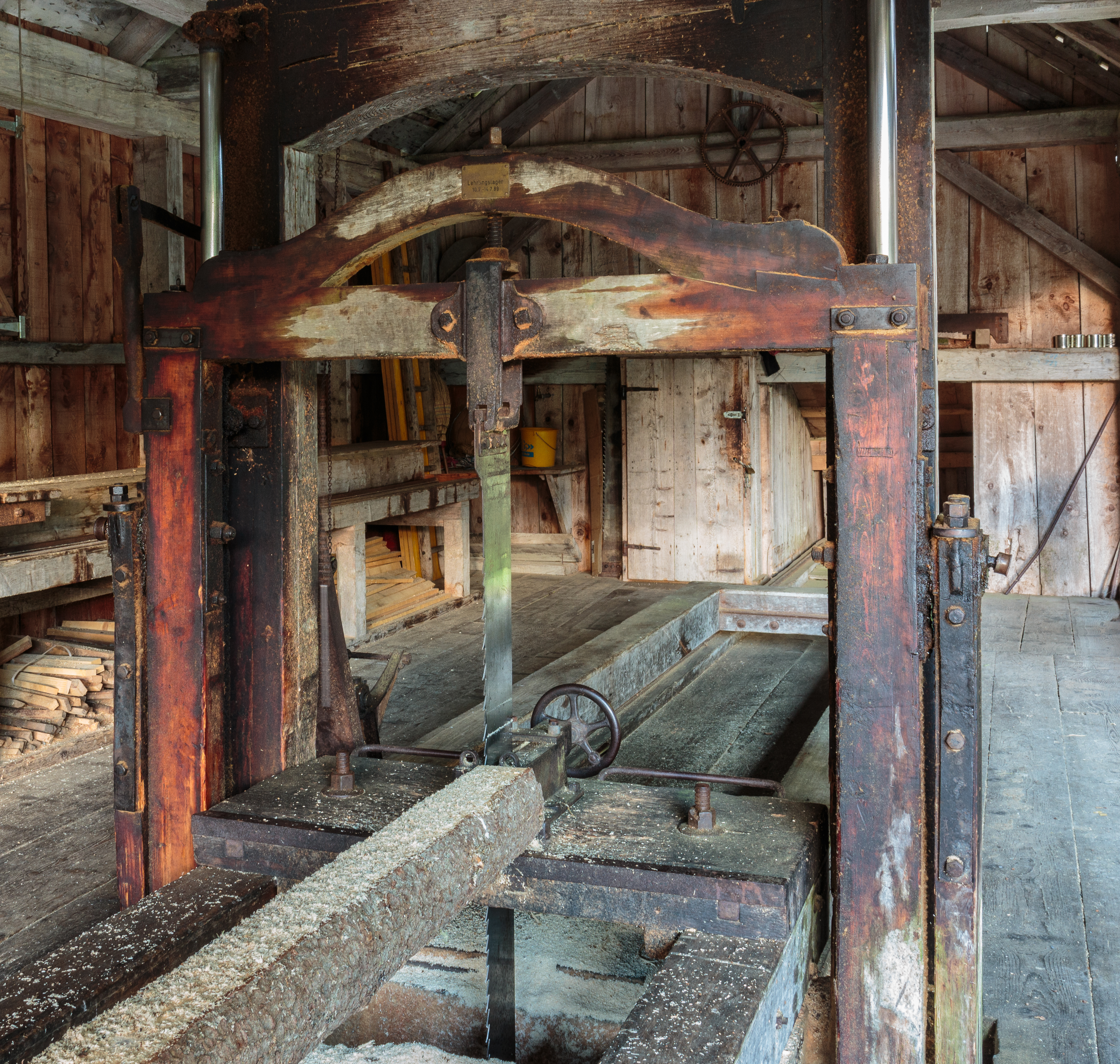
Wood sawing machine. Detail.

== Weather ==
Tschiertschen has an average of 123.9 days of rain per year and on average receives 1,095 mm (43.1 in) of precipitation. The wettest month is August during which time Tschiertschen receives an average of 140 mm (5.5 in) of precipitation. During this month there is precipitation for an average of 12.7 days. The month with the most days of precipitation is June, with an average of 13.1, but with only 128 mm (5.0 in) of precipitation. The driest month of the year is February with an average of 61 mm (2.4 in) of precipitation over 12.7 days.
