= Sprecher von Bernegg =

Sprecher von Bernegg may refer to:

- Sprecher von Bernegg family, a Swiss noble house

Sprecher von Bernegg is a surname. Notable people with the surname include:

- Fortunat Sprecher von Bernegg (1585–1647), a Grisons historian and diplomat
- Soloman Sprecher von Bernegg (1697–1758), a Habsburg field marshal
- Johann Andreas Sprecher von Bernegg (politician, born 1702) (1702–1765), a Grisons politician
- Anton Herkules Sprecher von Bernegg (1741–1827), a Grisons politician and judge
- Jakob Sprecher von Bernegg (1756–1822), a Swiss officer in Dutch service
- Johann Andreas Sprecher von Bernegg (politician, born 1811) (1811–1862), a Swiss lawyer and politician
- Hermann Sprecher von Bernegg (1843–1902), a Swiss lawyer, journalist and politician
- Theophil Sprecher von Bernegg (1850–1927), a Swiss politician and Chief of the General staff
- Arthur Sprecher von Bernegg (1852–1912), a Swiss officer in Austro-Hungarian service
