= Sprecher =

Sprecher is a surname. Notable people with the surname include:

- Andreas Sprecher (born 1944), Swiss alpine skier
- Ben Sprecher, Broadway producer and theater owner
- Claudio Sprecher (born 1980), Liechtensteiner alpine skier
- Florian Sprecher (1548–1612), Grisons politician
- Jeffrey Sprecher (born 1955), American businessman
- Jill Sprecher, American film director
- Johann Sprecher (1582–1631), Grisons politician and military officer
- Lorrie Sprecher, novelist, poet, and punk musician
- Robert Arthur Sprecher (1917–1982), United States federal judge
- Samuel Sprecher, Wittenberg University president from 1849–1874

== See also ==
- Sprecher Brewery, brewery in Wisconsin
- Sprecher von Bernegg family, Swiss noble family
- Sprecher's shunt, metabolic pathway
