= Johann Andreas Sprecher von Bernegg =

Johann Andreas Sprecher von Bernegg may refer to:

- Johann Andreas Sprecher von Bernegg (politician, born 1702) (1702–1765), Bundslandammann of the League of the Ten Jurisdictions, brother of Soloman Sprecher von Bernegg
- Johann Andreas Sprecher von Bernegg (politician, born 1811) (1811–1862), Swiss lawyer and politician, member of the Council of States and the National Council

== See also ==
- Sprecher von Bernegg family
