= List of members of the Federal Assembly from the Canton of Grisons =

Coat of Arms

This is a list of members of both houses of the Federal Assembly from the Canton of Grisons.

== Members of the Council of States ==
Councillor (Party)	Election	Councillor (Party)
Joh. Rudolf Brosi; Free Democratic Party; 1848–1849	Appointed	Anton Philipp Ganzoni; Free Democratic Party; 1848–1851
Giuseppe a Marca; Conservative; 1849–1851	Appointed	Anton Philipp Ganzoni; Free Democratic Party; 1848–1851
Ludwig Anton Vieli; Conservative; 1851–1852	Appointed	Peter Conradin von Planta; Free Democratic Party; 1852–1852
Johann Andreas von Sprecher; Liberal Party; 1853–1854	Appointed	Johann Bartholome Caflisch; Free Democratic Party; 1853–1856
Caspar Latour; Liberal Party; 1854–1855	Appointed	Johann Bartholome Caflisch; Free Democratic Party; 1853–1856
Joh. Gaudenz von Salis; Free Democratic Party; 1855–1855	Appointed	Johann Bartholome Caflisch; Free Democratic Party; 1853–1856
Peter Conradin von Planta; Free Democratic Party; 1856–1856	Appointed	Johann Bartholome Caflisch; Free Democratic Party; 1853–1856
Joh. Rudolf Brosi; Free Democratic Party; 1856–1857	Appointed	Ludwig Anton Vieli; Conservative; 1856–1857
Caspar Latour; Liberal Party; 1857–1857	Appointed	Joh. Baptist Friedrich Tscharner; Liberal Party; 1857–1858
Ludwig Anton Vieli; Conservative; 1858–1859	Appointed	Joh. Gaudenz von Salis; Free Democratic Party; 1858–1860
Johann Bartholome Caflisch; Free Democratic Party; 1859–1860	Appointed	Joh. Gaudenz von Salis; Free Democratic Party; 1858–1860
Johann Bartholome Arpagaus; Conservateurs modérés 1860–1861	Appointed	Johann Andreas von Sprecher; Liberal Party; 1860–1861
Alois Latour; Liberal Party; 1861–1862	Appointed	Johann A. Romedi; Liberal Party; 1861–1862
Herkules Oswald; Liberal Party; 1862–1863	Appointed	Peter Conradin von Planta; Free Democratic Party; 1862–1863
Johann A. Romedi; Liberal Party; 1863–1864	Appointed	Ludwig Anton Vieli; Conservative; 1863–1864
Peter Conradin von Planta; Free Democratic Party; 1864–1872	Appointed	Remigius Peterelli; Conservative; 1864–1865
Peter Conradin von Planta; Free Democratic Party; 1864–1872	Appointed	Gaudenz Gadmer; Free Democratic Party; 1865–1866
Peter Conradin von Planta; Free Democratic Party; 1864–1872	Appointed	Remigius Peterelli; Conservative; 1866–1868
Peter Conradin von Planta; Free Democratic Party; 1864–1872	Appointed	Johann Bartholome Caflisch; Free Democratic Party; 1868–1869
Peter Conradin von Planta; Free Democratic Party; 1864–1872	Appointed	Remigius Peterelli; Conservative; 1869–1871
Peter Conradin von Planta; Free Democratic Party; 1864–1872	Appointed	Hans Hold; Free Democratic Party; 1871–1872
Jochen Ulrich Könz; Liberal Party; 1872–1873	Appointed	Remigius Peterelli; Conservative; 1872–1873
Prospero Albrici; Free Democratic Party; 1873–1874	Appointed	Hans Hold; Free Democratic Party; 1873–1881
Florian Gengel; Free Democratic Party; 1874–1880	Appointed	Hans Hold; Free Democratic Party; 1873–1881
Andreas Bezzola; Free Democratic Party; 1880–1881	Appointed	Hans Hold; Free Democratic Party; 1873–1881
Remigius Peterelli; Conservative; 1881–1892	Appointed	Peter Conradin Romedi; Conservateurs réformés 1881–1898
Luzius Raschein; Free Democratic Party; 1892–1899	Appointed	Peter Conradin Romedi; Conservateurs réformés 1881–1898
Felix Ludw. Calonder; Free Democratic Party; 1899–1913	Appointed	Franz Peterelli; Conservative; 1899–1907
Felix Ludw. Calonder; Free Democratic Party; 1899–1913	Appointed	Friedrich Brügger; Conservative; 1907–1930
Andreas Laely; Free Democratic Party; 1913–1935	Appointed	Friedrich Brügger; Conservative; 1907–1930
Andreas Laely; Free Democratic Party; 1913–1935	Appointed	Johann Josef Huonder; Conservative; 1930–1935
Andreas Laely; Free Democratic Party; 1913–1935	1931	Johann Josef Huonder; Conservative; 1930–1935
Albert Lardelli; Swiss Democrats; 1935–1956	1935	Georg Willi; Conservative; 1935–1938
Albert Lardelli; Swiss Democrats; 1935–1956	1939	Josef Vieli; Conservative; 1939–1956
Albert Lardelli; Swiss Democrats; 1935–1956	1943	Josef Vieli; Conservative; 1939–1956
Albert Lardelli; Swiss Democrats; 1935–1956	1947	Josef Vieli; Conservative; 1939–1956
Albert Lardelli; Swiss Democrats; 1935–1956	1951	Josef Vieli; Conservative; 1939–1956
Albert Lardelli; Swiss Democrats; 1935–1956	1955	Josef Vieli; Conservative; 1939–1956
Arno Theus; Swiss Democrats; 1956–1974	1956	Gion Darms; Conservative; 1956–1968
Arno Theus; Swiss Democrats; 1956–1974	1959	Gion Darms; Conservative; 1956–1968
Arno Theus; Swiss Democrats; 1956–1974	1963	Gion Darms; Conservative; 1956–1968
Arno Theus; Swiss Democrats; 1956–1974	1967	Gion Darms; Conservative; 1956–1968
Arno Theus; Swiss Democrats; 1956–1974	1968	Gion Clau Vincenz; Christian Social Conservative Party; 1968–1979
Arno Theus; Swiss Democrats; 1956–1974	1971	Gion Clau Vincenz; Christian Social Conservative Party; 1968–1979
Leon Schlumpf; Swiss People's Party; 1974–1979	1974	Gion Clau Vincenz; Christian Social Conservative Party; 1968–1979
Leon Schlumpf; Swiss People's Party; 1974–1979	1975	Gion Clau Vincenz; Christian Social Conservative Party; 1968–1979
Leon Schlumpf; Swiss People's Party; 1974–1979	1979	Luregn Mathias Cavelty; Christian Democratic People's Party; 1979–1995
Ulrich Gadient; Swiss People's Party; 1980–1995	1980	Luregn Mathias Cavelty; Christian Democratic People's Party; 1979–1995
Ulrich Gadient; Swiss People's Party; 1980–1995	1983	Luregn Mathias Cavelty; Christian Democratic People's Party; 1979–1995
Ulrich Gadient; Swiss People's Party; 1980–1995	1987	Luregn Mathias Cavelty; Christian Democratic People's Party; 1979–1995
Ulrich Gadient; Swiss People's Party; 1980–1995	1991	Luregn Mathias Cavelty; Christian Democratic People's Party; 1979–1995
Christoffel Brändli; Swiss People's Party; 1995–2011	1995	Theo Maissen; Christian Democratic People's Party; 1995–2011
Christoffel Brändli; Swiss People's Party; 1995–2011	1999	Theo Maissen; Christian Democratic People's Party; 1995–2011
Christoffel Brändli; Swiss People's Party; 1995–2011	2003	Theo Maissen; Christian Democratic People's Party; 1995–2011
Christoffel Brändli; Swiss People's Party; 1995–2011	2007	Theo Maissen; Christian Democratic People's Party; 1995–2011
Martin Schmid; FDP.The Liberals; 2011–present	2011	Stefan Engler; Christian Democratic People's Party; 2011–2023; The Centre; 2023–present
Martin Schmid; FDP.The Liberals; 2011–present	2015	Stefan Engler; Christian Democratic People's Party; 2011–2023; The Centre; 2023–present
Martin Schmid; FDP.The Liberals; 2011–present	2019	Stefan Engler; Christian Democratic People's Party; 2011–2023; The Centre; 2023–present
Martin Schmid; FDP.The Liberals; 2011–present	2023	Stefan Engler; Christian Democratic People's Party; 2011–2023; The Centre; 2023–present

== Members of the National Council ==
Election	Councillor (Party)	Councillor (Party)	Councillor (Party)	Councillor (Party)	Councillor (Party)	Councillor (Party)
1848	Johann Baptist Bavier (Liberal)	Alois Latour (Liberal)	Georg Michel (FDP/PRD)	Andreas Rudolf von Planta (Liberal)	4 seats 1848–1863	
1849	Johann Baptist Bavier (Liberal)	Alois Latour (Liberal)	Joh. Rudolf Brosi (FDP/PRD)	Andreas Rudolf von Planta (Liberal)	4 seats 1848–1863	
1851	Johann Baptist Bavier (Liberal)	Johann Bartholome Arpagaus (Conservative)	Georg Michel (FDP/PRD)	Andreas Rudolf von Planta (Liberal)	4 seats 1848–1863	
1854	Johann Baptist Bavier (Liberal)	Alois Latour (Liberal)	Georg Michel (FDP/PRD)	Andreas Rudolf von Planta (Liberal)	4 seats 1848–1863	
1856	Peter Conradin von Planta (FDP/PRD)	Alois Latour (Liberal)	Georg Michel (FDP/PRD)	Andreas Rudolf von Planta (Liberal)	4 seats 1848–1863	
1857	Caspar Latour (Liberal)	Johann Andreas von Sprecher (Liberal)	Georg Michel (FDP/PRD)	Andreas Rudolf von Planta (Liberal)	4 seats 1848–1863	
1860	Caspar Latour (Liberal)	Johann Bartholome Caflisch (FDP/PRD)	Joh. Gaudenz von Salis (FDP/PRD)	Andreas Rudolf von Planta (Liberal)	4 seats 1848–1863	
1861	Johann Rudolf von Toggenburg (Conservative)	Johann Bartholome Caflisch (FDP/PRD)	Joh. Gaudenz von Salis (FDP/PRD)	Andreas Rudolf von Planta (Liberal)	4 seats 1848–1863	
1863	Johann Rudolf von Toggenburg (Conservative)	Simeon Bavier (Liberal)	Joh. Gaudenz von Salis (FDP/PRD)	Andreas Rudolf von Planta (Liberal)	Alois Latour (Liberal)	5 seats 1863–1911
1866	Johann Rudolf von Toggenburg (Conservative)	Simeon Bavier (Liberal)	Joh. Gaudenz von Salis (FDP/PRD)	Andreas Rudolf von Planta (Liberal)	Alois Latour (Liberal)	5 seats 1863–1911
1869	Johann Rudolf von Toggenburg (Conservative)	Simeon Bavier (Liberal)	Johann Bartholome Caflisch (FDP/PRD)	Gaudenz Gadmer (FDP/PRD)	Johann A. Romedi (Liberal)	5 seats 1863–1911
1872	Johann Rudolf von Toggenburg (Conservative)	Simeon Bavier (Liberal)	Johann Anton sen. Casparis (Liberal)	Hermann Jakob U. von Sprecher (FödP*)	Johann A. Romedi (Liberal)	5 seats 1863–1911
1875	Johann Rudolf von Toggenburg (Conservative)	Simeon Bavier (Liberal)	Anton Steinhauser (FDP/PRD)	Joh. Gaudenz von Salis (FDP/PRD)	Johann A. Romedi (Liberal)	5 seats 1863–1911
1876	Johann Rudolf von Toggenburg (Conservative)	Simeon Bavier (Liberal)	Anton Steinhauser (FDP/PRD)	Joh. Gaudenz von Salis (FDP/PRD)	Andreas Rudolf von Planta (Liberal)	5 seats 1863–1911
1878	Johann Rudolf von Toggenburg (Conservative)	Hermann Jakob U. von Sprecher (FödP*)	Anton Steinhauser (FDP/PRD)	Joh. Gaudenz von Salis (FDP/PRD)	Andreas Rudolf von Planta (Liberal)	5 seats 1863–1911
1881	Johann Schmid (Conservative)	Hermann Jakob U. von Sprecher (FödP*)	Anton Steinhauser (FDP/PRD)	Andreas Bezzola (FDP/PRD)	Caspar Decurtins (FödP*)	5 seats 1863–1911
1882	Johann Schmid (Conservative)	Hermann Jakob U. von Sprecher (FödP*)	Luzius Raschein (FDP/PRD)	Andreas Bezzola (FDP/PRD)	Caspar Decurtins (FödP*)	5 seats 1863–1911
1883	Johann Schmid (Conservative)	Peter Theophil Bühler (Liberal)	Luzius Raschein (FDP/PRD)	Andreas Bezzola (FDP/PRD)	Caspar Decurtins (FödP*)	5 seats 1863–1911
1884	Johann Schmid (Conservative)	Peter Theophil Bühler (Liberal)	Luzius Raschein (FDP/PRD)	Andreas Bezzola (FDP/PRD)	Caspar Decurtins (FödP*)	5 seats 1863–1911
1887	Johann Schmid (Conservative)	Peter Theophil Bühler (Liberal)	Luzius Raschein (FDP/PRD)	Andreas Bezzola (FDP/PRD)	Caspar Decurtins (FödP*)	5 seats 1863–1911
1890	Johann Schmid (Conservative)	Peter Theophil Bühler (Liberal)	Matthäus Risch (Liberal)	Andreas Bezzola (FDP/PRD)	Caspar Decurtins (FödP*)	5 seats 1863–1911
1893	Thomas von Albertini (Liberal)	Peter Theophil Bühler (Liberal)	Matthäus Risch (Liberal)	Johann Anton jun. Casparis (FDP/PRD)	Caspar Decurtins (FödP*)	5 seats 1863–1911
1896	Thomas von Albertini (Liberal)	Peter Theophil Bühler (Liberal)	Matthäus Risch (Liberal)	Alfred von Planta (FödP*)	Caspar Decurtins (FödP*)	5 seats 1863–1911
1899	Andreas Vital (FDP/PRD)	Peter Theophil Bühler (Liberal)	Matthäus Risch (Liberal)	Alfred von Planta (FödP*)	Caspar Decurtins (FödP*)	5 seats 1863–1911
1902	Andreas Vital (FDP/PRD)	Johann Anton Caflisch (FDP/PRD)	Eduard Walser (FDP/PRD)	Alfred von Planta (FödP*)	Caspar Decurtins (FödP*)	5 seats 1863–1911
1905	Andreas Vital (FDP/PRD)	Johann Anton Caflisch (FDP/PRD)	Eduard Walser (FDP/PRD)	Alfred von Planta (FödP*)	Johann Schmid (Conservative)	5 seats 1863–1911
1908	Andreas Vital (FDP/PRD)	Johann Anton Caflisch (FDP/PRD)	Eduard Walser (FDP/PRD)	Alfred von Planta (FödP*)	Johann Schmid (Conservative)	5 seats 1863–1911
1911	Andreas Vital (FDP/PRD)	Johann Anton Caflisch (FDP/PRD)	Eduard Walser (FDP/PRD)	Alfred von Planta (FödP*)	Johann Schmid (Conservative)	Paul Raschein (FDP/PRD)
1914	Andreas Vital (FDP/PRD)	Johann Anton Caflisch (FDP/PRD)	Eduard Walser (FDP/PRD)	Alfred von Planta (FödP*)	Johann Schmid (Conservative)	Paul Raschein (FDP/PRD)
1915	Andreas Vital (FDP/PRD)	Johann Anton Caflisch (FDP/PRD)	Eduard Walser (FDP/PRD)	Alois Steinhauser (Conservative)	Johann Schmid (Conservative)	Paul Raschein (FDP/PRD)
1917	Andreas Vital (FDP/PRD)	Johann Anton Caflisch (FDP/PRD)	Eduard Walser (FDP/PRD)	Alois Steinhauser (Conservative)	Johann Schmid (Conservative)	Paul Raschein (FDP/PRD)
1919	Hans Meng (SP/PS)	Johann Anton Caflisch (FDP/PRD)	Eduard Walser (FDP/PRD)	Julius E. F. Dedual (Conservative)	Johann Bossi (Conservative)	Johann Vonmoos (FDP/PRD)
1922	Christian-Albert Hitz (Communist)	Johann Anton Caflisch (FDP/PRD)	Eduard Walser (FDP/PRD)	Julius E. F. Dedual (Conservative)	Johann Bossi (Conservative)	Johann Vonmoos (FDP/PRD)
1925	Gaudenz Canova (SP/PS)	Paul Raschein (FDP/PRD)	Eduard Walser (FDP/PRD)	Julius E. F. Dedual (Conservative)	Johann Bossi (Conservative)	Johann Vonmoos (FDP/PRD)
1925	Christian Foppa (Conservative)	Andreas Gadient (SD/DS)	Eduard Walser (FDP/PRD)	Julius E. F. Dedual (Conservative)	Johann Bossi (Conservative)	Johann Vonmoos (FDP/PRD)
1928	Christian Foppa (Conservative)	Andreas Gadient (SD/DS)	Anton Meuli (FDP/PRD)	Gaudenz Canova (SP/PS)	Johann Bossi (Conservative)	Johann Vonmoos (FDP/PRD)
1931	Christian Foppa (Conservative)	Andreas Gadient (SD/DS)	Georg Hartmann (FDP/PRD)	Gaudenz Canova (SP/PS)	Johann Bossi (Conservative)	Johann Vonmoos (FDP/PRD)
1932	Christian Foppa (Conservative)	Andreas Gadient (SD/DS)	Anton Meuli (FDP/PRD)	Gaudenz Canova (SP/PS)	Johann Bossi (Conservative)	Johann Vonmoos (FDP/PRD)
1935	Christian Foppa (Conservative)	Andreas Gadient (SD/DS)	Josef Condrau (Conservative)	Ruben Lanicca (SD/DS)	Johann Bossi (Conservative)	Johann Vonmoos (FDP/PRD)
1939	Rudolf Planta (SD/DS)	Andreas Gadient (SD/DS)	Josef Condrau (Conservative)	Ruben Lanicca (SD/DS)	Johann Bossi (Conservative)	Johann Vonmoos (FDP/PRD)
1942	Georg Sprecher (SD/DS)	Andreas Gadient (SD/DS)	Josef Condrau (Conservative)	Ruben Lanicca (SD/DS)	Johann Bossi (Conservative)	Johann Vonmoos (FDP/PRD)
1943	Georg Sprecher (SD/DS)	Andreas Gadient (SD/DS)	Josef Condrau (Conservative)	Ruben Lanicca (SD/DS)	Luigi Albrecht (Conservative)	Adolf Nadig (FDP/PRD)
1947	Georg Sprecher (SD/DS)	Andreas Gadient (SD/DS)	Josef Condrau (Conservative)	Ettore Tenchio (Conservative)	Luigi Albrecht (Conservative)	Gian Rudolf Mohr (FDP/PRD)
1951	Georg Sprecher (SD/DS)	Andreas Gadient (SD/DS)	Josef Condrau (Conservative)	Ettore Tenchio (Conservative)	Luigi Albrecht (Conservative)	Paul Raschein (FDP/PRD)
1955	Georg Sprecher (SD/DS)	Andreas Gadient (SD/DS)	Josef Condrau (Conservative)	Ettore Tenchio (Conservative)	Rudolf Toggenburg (Conservative)	Paul Raschein (FDP/PRD)
1959	Georg Sprecher (SD/DS)	Andreas Gadient (SD/DS)	Josef Condrau (Conservative)	Ettore Tenchio (Conservative)	Paul Bruggmann (CCS)	Paul Raschein (FDP/PRD)
1959	Georg Brosi (SD/DS)	Christian Bühler (SD/DS)	Josef Condrau (Conservative)	Ettore Tenchio (Conservative)	Hans Stiffler (SP/PS)	Paul Raschein (FDP/PRD)
1963	Georg Brosi (SD/DS)	Christian Bühler (SD/DS)	Josef Condrau (Conservative)	Ettore Tenchio (Conservative)	Oscar Mayer (SP/PS)	Paul Raschein (FDP/PRD)
1963	Georg Brosi (SD/DS)	Christian Bühler (SD/DS)	Donat Cadruvi (CCS)	Ettore Tenchio (Conservative)	5 seats 1963-present	Josias Grass (FDP/PRD)
1966	Georg Brosi (SD/DS)	Leon Schlumpf (SD/DS)	Donat Cadruvi (CCS)	Ettore Tenchio (Conservative)	5 seats 1963-present	Josias Grass (FDP/PRD)
1967	Georg Brosi (SD/DS)	Leon Schlumpf (SD/DS)	Donat Cadruvi (CCS)	Ettore Tenchio (Conservative)	5 seats 1963-present	Josias Grass (FDP/PRD)
1971	Georg Brosi (SD/DS)	Leon Schlumpf (SD/DS)	Toni Cantieni (CVP/PDC)	Luregn Mathias Cavelty (CVP/PDC)	5 seats 1963-present	Josias Grass (FDP/PRD)
1974	Georg Brosi (SD/DS)	Elisabeth Lardelli (SVP/UDC)	Toni Cantieni (CVP/PDC)	Luregn Mathias Cavelty (CVP/PDC)	5 seats 1963-present	Josias Grass (FDP/PRD)
1975	Georg Brosi (SD/DS)	Martin Bundi (SP/PS)	Toni Cantieni (CVP/PDC)	Luregn Mathias Cavelty (CVP/PDC)	5 seats 1963-present	Jakob Schutz (FDP/PRD)
1979	Georg Brosi (SD/DS)	Martin Bundi (SP/PS)	Toni Cantieni (CVP/PDC)	Leonhard Flepp (CVP/PDC)	5 seats 1963-present	Jakob Schutz (FDP/PRD)
1979	Ulrich Gadient (SVP/UDC)	Martin Bundi (SP/PS)	Toni Cantieni (CVP/PDC)	Dumeni Columberg (CVP/PDC)	5 seats 1963-present	Christian Jost (FDP/PRD)
1980	Simeon Bühler (SVP/UDC)	Martin Bundi (SP/PS)	Toni Cantieni (CVP/PDC)	Dumeni Columberg (CVP/PDC)	5 seats 1963-present	Christian Jost (FDP/PRD)
1983	Simeon Bühler (SVP/UDC)	Martin Bundi (SP/PS)	Toni Cantieni (CVP/PDC)	Dumeni Columberg (CVP/PDC)	5 seats 1963-present	Peter Aliesch (FDP/PRD)
1987	Simeon Bühler (SVP/UDC)	Martin Bundi (SP/PS)	Théo Christian Portmann (CVP/PDC)	Dumeni Columberg (CVP/PDC)	5 seats 1963-present	Peter Aliesch (FDP/PRD)
1991	Simeon Bühler (SVP/UDC)	Martin Bundi (SP/PS)	Andrea Hämmerle (SP/PS)	Dumeni Columberg (CVP/PDC)	5 seats 1963-present	Duri Bezzola (FDP/PRD)
1995	Brigitta M. Gadient (SVP/UDC)	Silva Anita Semadeni (SP/PS)	Andrea Hämmerle (SP/PS)	Dumeni Columberg (CVP/PDC)	5 seats 1963-present	Duri Bezzola (FDP/PRD)
1999	Brigitta M. Gadient (SVP/UDC)	Hansjörg Hassler (SVP/UDC)	Andrea Hämmerle (SP/PS)	Walter Decurtins (CVP/PDC)	5 seats 1963-present	Duri Bezzola (FDP/PRD)
2003	Brigitta M. Gadient (SVP/UDC)	Hansjörg Hassler (SVP/UDC)	Andrea Hämmerle (SP/PS)	Sep Cathomas (CVP/PDC)	5 seats 1963-present	Duri Bezzola (FDP/PRD)
2007	Brigitta M. Gadient (SVP/UDC)	Hansjörg Hassler (SVP/UDC)	Andrea Hämmerle (SP/PS)	Sep Cathomas (CVP/PDC)	5 seats 1963-present	Jürg Michel (FDP/PRD)
2007	Brigitta M. Gadient (SVP/UDC)	Hansjörg Hassler (SVP/UDC)	Andrea Hämmerle (SP/PS)	Sep Cathomas (CVP/PDC)	5 seats 1963-present	Tarzisius Caviezel (FDP/PRD)
2011	Heinz Brand (SVP/UDC)	Hansjörg Hassler (SVP/UDC)	Silva Semadeni (SP/PS)	Martin Candinas (CVP/PDC / The Centre)	5 seats 1963-present	Josias F. Gasser (GLP/PVL)
2015	Heinz Brand (SVP/UDC)	Magdalena Martullo-Blocher (SVP/UDC)	Silva Semadeni (SP/PS)	Martin Candinas (CVP/PDC / The Centre)	5 seats 1963-present	Duri Campell (BDP/PBD)
2019	Jon Pult (SP/PS)	Magdalena Martullo-Blocher (SVP/UDC)	Sandra Locher Benguerel (SP/PS)	Martin Candinas (CVP/PDC / The Centre)	5 seats 1963-present	Anna Giacometti (FDP.The Liberals)
2023	Jon Pult (SP/PS)	Magdalena Martullo-Blocher (SVP/UDC)	Roman Hug (SVP/UDC)	Martin Candinas (CVP/PDC / The Centre)	5 seats 1963-present	Anna Giacometti (FDP.The Liberals)
