= Johann Sprecher =

Grisons politician (1582–1631)

- Born: February 1582; Davos, Three Leagues
- Died: 3 November 1631 (aged 49); Maienfeld, Three Leagues
- Occupations: Politician; military officer
- Spouses: Ursula Buol; Barbara von Capol; Maria von Mont

Johann Sprecher (February 1582 – 3 November 1631) was a politician and military officer from Davos. He was landammann of Davos and Bundslandammann (head) of the League of the Ten Jurisdictions in 1607–1612 and 1614–1620, and from 1625 at the latest until his death he was a colonel in French service.

== Biography ==
Johann Sprecher was a member of the Sprecher von Bernegg family. He was the son of Florian Sprecher and the brother of Fortunat. He married first Ursula Buol in 1598, second Barbara von Capol in 1614, and third Maria von Mont in 1618.

From 1605 to 1607 he was vicari (judge) in the Valtellina. In 1607–1612 and 1614–1620 he was landammann of Davos and therefore also Bundslandammann of the League of the Ten Jurisdictions. In 1622 he was an envoy to the Federal Diet (Tagsatzung). From 1625 at the latest until his death he was a colonel in French service.

== Bibliography ==
- Stammbaum der Familie Sprecher von Bernegg, 1, [1936], 70–72
