= Hermann Sprecher von Bernegg =

Swiss politician (1843–1902)

- Lithograph from the Schweizerische Portrait-Gallerie, 1894
- Born: 3 August 1843; Chur, Switzerland
- Died: 27 July 1902 (aged 58); Zurich, Switzerland
- Occupations: Lawyer; journalist; politician

Hermann Sprecher von Bernegg (also Hermann Sprecher; 3 August 1843 – 27 July 1902) was a Swiss lawyer, journalist and politician from Chur. In 1870 he and two partners bought the newspaper Bündner Tagblatt, which then changed from a liberal paper into the leading paper of the federalist conservatives. He was mayor of Chur in 1894 and represented the Grisons in the National Council in 1872–1875 and 1878–1883.

== Biography ==
Hermann Sprecher von Bernegg was a member of the Sprecher von Bernegg family. He was the son of Johann Andreas, the brother of Arthur, and a cousin of Theophil. He did not marry. He attended the gymnasium in Stuttgart and studied law in Tübingen and Erlangen.

He was a lawyer and journalist in Chur. In 1870, together with Emil Meyer-Amarca and Placidus Plattner, he acquired the Pargätzi printing and publishing business and with it the Bündner Tagblatt, which changed from a liberal paper into the leading paper of the federalist conservatives. In 1872, alongside Andreas Rudolf von Planta, he was a leading opponent of the revision of the federal constitution and editor of the Bündner Stimmen. Between 1871 and 1895 he was several times a member of the Small City Council (Kleiner Stadtrat), the executive of Chur, and in 1894 he was mayor (Bürgermeister). He represented the Grisons in the National Council in 1872–1875 and 1878–1883, and was a cantonal judge in 1873–1875, 1882–1884 and 1893–1895. From the 1870s to the 1890s he led the Reformed wing of the federalist-conservative circles in Chur. In Bern he represented the conservative minority and what he called "intransigent federalism". He was very popular in the Grisons.

== Bibliography ==
- E. Gruner, Die schweizerische Bundesversammlung 1848–1920, 1, 1966, 628
- P. Metz, Geschichte des Kantons Graubünden, 1, 1989
- D. Foppa, "Die Geschichte der deutschsprachigen Tagespresse des Kantons Graubünden", in Jahrbuch der Historischen Gesellschaft von Graubünden, 132, 2002, 1–71
