= Conrad von Planta =

Grisons politician (fl. 1492–1517)

- Died: After 1517
- Occupations: Politician; military commander
- Spouse: Catharina von Porta

Conrad von Planta (first mentioned 1492; died after 1517) was a politician and military commander from the Three Leagues. In 1512 he commanded the troops of the League of God's House in the conquest of the Valtellina by the Three Leagues, and the same year he became the first governor of the Valtellina.

== Biography ==
Conrad von Planta was a member of the Planta family. He was the son of Parcifal, Ammann in the Upper Engadine. His mother was a daughter of Fortunat von Castelmur; her first name is unknown. He married Catharina von Porta. His grandson was Florian Sprecher.

In 1492 he was landammann in the Upper Engadine, and in 1500 the bishop's captain (Hauptmann) at the Fürstenburg. In 1502 he sealed the peace treaty between the Three Leagues and Austria. In 1508, together with Johann von Königsegg and 2,000 men, he escorted Emperor Maximilian I as far as Lake Garda, where the Venetians prevented them from marching further. In 1512, on behalf of the bishop of Chur, he commanded the troops of the League of God's House (Gotteshausleute) in the conquest of the Valtellina by the Three Leagues. The same year he became the first governor (Landeshauptmann) of the Valtellina. He was later the bishop's bailiff (Vogt) in Val Poschiavo and at Greifenstein, and in 1515 podestà of Tirano.

== Bibliography ==
- P. von Planta, Chronik der Familie von Planta nebst verschiedenen Mittheilungen aus der Vergangenheit Rhätiens, 1892, 107, 144
