= Arthur Sprecher von Bernegg =

Austro-Hungarian general (1852–1912)

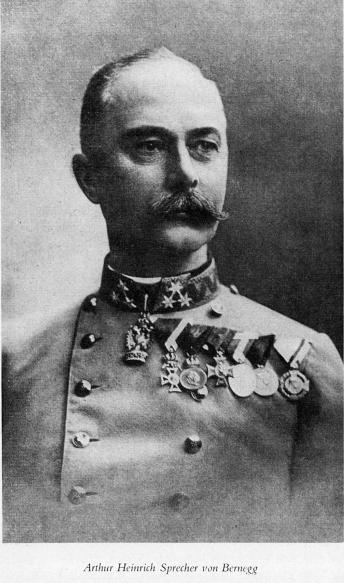
- Born: 22 August 1852; Chur, Switzerland
- Died: 2 October 1912 (aged 60); Pressburg (now Bratislava), Austria-Hungary
- Spouse: Helene Sprecher von Bernegg
- Military career
- Allegiance: Austria-Hungary
- Rank: General of the infantry
- Commands: 28th Infantry Brigade; 47th Infantry Division; 49th Infantry Division; 5th Corps

Arthur Sprecher von Bernegg (also Arthur Heinrich Sprecher von Bernegg; 22 August 1852 – 2 October 1912) was a Swiss officer in the service of Austria-Hungary, in which he became a general of the infantry and commander of the 5th Corps in Pressburg.

== Biography ==
Arthur Sprecher von Bernegg was a member of the Sprecher von Bernegg family. He was the son of Johann Andreas, the brother of Hermann, and a cousin of Theophil. He married Helene, née Sprecher von Bernegg, daughter of Ambrosi. He went to school in Schiers and Lausanne.

He spent his entire military career in Austria-Hungary. In 1868 he joined the imperial and royal Infantry Regiment Hoch- und Deutschmeister No. 4 as an infantryman. In 1877 he attended the imperial and royal war college (Kriegsschule), in 1879 he was assigned to the general staff, and in 1890 to the military chancellery of Emperor Franz Joseph. In 1901 he became imperial and royal chamberlain (Kämmerer) and commander of the 28th Infantry Brigade in Ödenburg (now Sopron, Hungary), in 1907 commander of the 47th Infantry Division, and in 1909 of the 49th Infantry Division. In 1910 he became a general of the infantry, commander of the 5th Corps in Pressburg, and imperial and royal privy councilor (Geheimer Rat). Until his death he was proprietor (Inhaber) of the Infantry Regiment Sprecher von Bernegg No. 48.

== Bibliography ==
- Stammbaum der Familie Sprecher von Bernegg, 2 vols., [1936]
- E. Putz, "General der Infanterie Arthur Heinrich Sprecher von Bernegg (1852–1912)", in Allgemeine Schweizerische Militärzeitschrift, 1965, no. 2, 79–85
- Österreichisches Biographisches Lexikon 1815–1950, 13, 48
