= Elisabeth Lardelli =

Swiss lawyer and politician (1921–2008)

- Born: Elisabeth von Waldkirch; 21 February 1921; Bern, Switzerland
- Died: 9 March 2008 (aged 87); Chur, Switzerland
- Education: University of Bern
- Organization(s): Grisons Women's Associations Liaison Centre, Swiss Organisation of Female Academics
- Political party: Swiss People's Party
- Children: 3

Elisabeth Lardelli (née von Waldkirch, 21 February 1921 in Bern; died 9 March 2008 in Chur; originally from Poschiavo) was a Swiss lawyer, politician and suffragist. She was a politician of the Swiss People's Party. She was a National Councillor for the canton of Grisons from 1974 to 1975.

== Life and career ==
She was the daughter of the Republican lawyer and politician Eduard von Waldkirch.

After she earned her Matura in Bern, Lardelli studied law at the University of Bern from 1941 to 1947 and obtained the advocate patent in Bern. After she moved to Chur in the canton of Grisons in 1950, she was the first woman to earn the lawyer patent in the canton of Grisons.

From 1955 to 1985, Lardelli headed the legal advice service of the Grisons Women's Associations Liaison Centre. Besides, she taught law in several schools.

From 1973 to 1979, Lardelli was a member of the Grand Council of Grisons for the Swiss People's Party. In 1974, she joined the National Council replacing Leon Schlumpf, who had been elected to the Council of States. She became the first female National Councillor from the canton of Grisons. She sat in the National Council until 1975.

From 1977 to 1980, Lardelli was the chairwoman of the Swiss Organisation of Female Academics. Lardelli campaigned for women's suffrage and for gender equality, as well as for new children's rights and marriage law.

She was married with lawyer Albert Lardelli and had three children.

== See also ==
- List of members of the Federal Assembly from the Canton of Grisons

== Bibliography ==
- Ursus Brunold: "Lardelli, Elisabeth" in German, French and Italian in the online Historical Dictionary of Switzerland.
- "Lardelli-von Waldkirch, Elisabeth (1921-2008)". Das Online-Lexikon der Frauen in Graubünden (in German).
