= Anton Herkules Sprecher von Bernegg =

Grisons politician (1741–1827)

- Born: 30 March 1741; Grüsch, Three Leagues
- Died: 21 March 1827 (aged 85); Grüsch, Switzerland
- Occupations: Politician; judge
- Spouses: Ursula Katharina Buol; Margaretha Brügger; Maria Magdalena von Ott

Anton Herkules Sprecher von Bernegg (also Anton Herkules Sprecher; 30 March 1741 – 21 March 1827) was a politician and judge from Grüsch in the Grisons. In 1799, forced by the French commander, he became president of the provisional cantonal government and signed the act of union of the Grisons with the Helvetic Republic. In 1802 he became justice of the peace in Davos and president of the district court of the Prättigau.

== Biography ==
Anton Herkules Sprecher von Bernegg was a member of the Sprecher von Bernegg family. He was the son of Johann Andreas. He married first Ursula Katharina Buol, second Margaretha Brügger, and third Maria Magdalena von Ott. In 1807 his daughter Dorothea married Jakob Sprecher von Bernegg.

He was tutored by Johann Peter Nesemann and studied in Geneva and Basel. From 1761 to 1763 he was commissioner (commissari) in Chiavenna. In 1799, forced by the French commander, he took over the presidency of the provisional cantonal government and signed the act of union of the Grisons with the Helvetic Republic. In 1802 he became justice of the peace in Davos and president of the district court of the Prättigau. He owned extensive land and real estate in Grüsch, Davos and Parpan. In old age he lost part of his fortune.

== Bibliography ==
- Stammbaum der Familie Sprecher von Bernegg, 2 vols., [1936]
- E. Messmer, "Eine Verwechslung, die sich hartnäckig hält. Anton Herkules (1741–1827) und Jakob Ulrich Sprecher (1765–1841)", in Bündner Monatsblatt, 1995, 520–525
