= Florian Sprecher =

Grisons politician (1548–1612)

- Born: 22 January 1548; Davos, Three Leagues
- Died: 18 April 1612 (aged 64); Davos, Three Leagues
- Occupations: Politician; military officer
- Spouse: Dorothea Brunner

Florian Sprecher (22 January 1548 – 18 April 1612) was a politician and military officer from Davos. He was several times landammann of Davos and Bundslandammann of the League of the Ten Jurisdictions, went on diplomatic missions to France and Austria, and was knighted by King Henry III of France in Paris in 1582.

== Biography ==
Florian Sprecher was a member of the Sprecher von Bernegg family. He was the son of Andreas, a lieutenant (Statthalter) and podestà, and Barbara Planta, and a grandson of Conrad von Planta. He married Dorothea Brunner, known as Büsch, of Davos. He was the progenitor of the Davos line of the family. His son, the historian Fortunat, introduced the noble predicate von Bernegg in his publications from 1615.

From 1566 to 1576 he was the clerk (Landschreiber) of Davos, and in 1582–1584, 1588–1592, and 1606–1607 he was landammann of Davos and Bundslandammann of the League of the Ten Jurisdictions. In 1574 and in 1585–1587 he served in France as an officer of a Grisons company (Fähnlein), and in 1582 and 1585 he was colonel of the League of the Ten Jurisdictions (Bundsoberst). He went on diplomatic missions to France and Austria. On one of them, in Paris in 1582 for the renewal of the alliance between the Three Leagues and France, King Henry III knighted him. In the same year the king granted him the noble predicate von Bernegg, in reference to the family's old tower house near Calfreisen. In 1590 he was an envoy to the Diet, and in 1606 a member of the Secret Council of Fifteen for the preservation of peace and liberty (Geheimer Rat der Fünfzehn). In 1607 the special criminal court (Strafgericht) of Ilanz charged him as a French partisan. He wrote a chronicle and description of the Davos region, which remained in manuscript.

== Bibliography ==
- Stammbaum der Familie Sprecher von Bernegg, 2 vols., [1936]

=== Archives ===
- State Archives of Graubünden, Chur
