= Says =

- Former municipality
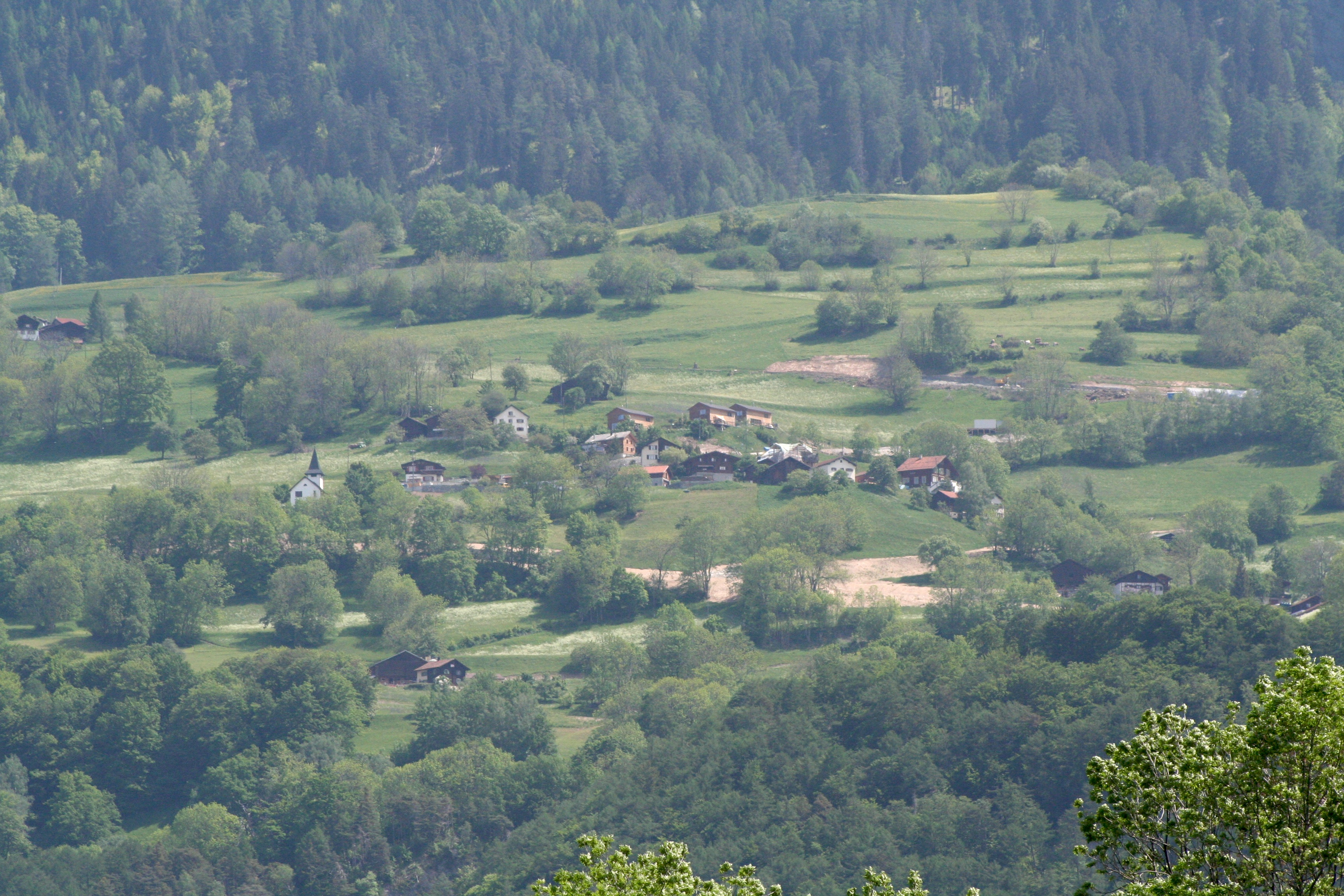
- Says village above Trimmis

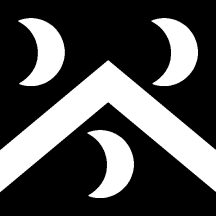
- Flag Coat of arms
- Location of Says
- Location within Switzerland Location within Canton of Graubünden
- Coordinates: 46°54′N 9°34′E
- Country: Switzerland
- Canton: Graubünden
- District: Landquart

Government
  - Mayor: Christa Käser

Population (December 2007)
  - Total: 158
- Time zone: UTC+01:00 (CET)
  - Summer (DST): UTC+02:00 (CEST)
- Postal code: 7202
- SFOS number: 3944
- ISO 3166 code: CH-GR
- Surrounded by: Calfreisen, Castiel, Trimmis, Valzeina, Zizers
- Website: www.says.ch

Says was a municipality in the district of Landquart in the Swiss canton of Graubünden. On 1 January 2008 the municipality was incorporated into neighboring Trimmis.

== History ==
Says is first mentioned in 1222 as in Seians. In 1258 it was mentioned as Seyes.

== Geography ==
Says has an area, as of 2006, of 14.4 km^{2} (5.6 sq mi). Of this area, 34.7% is used for agricultural purposes, while 51.9% is forested. Of the rest of the land, 0.9% is settled (buildings or roads) and the remainder (12.5%) is non-productive (rivers, glaciers or mountains).

The village is located in the Fünf Dörfer sub-district of the Landquart district. It is located on a terrace above the Churer Rheintal (Chur branch of the Rhine river). It consists of the sections of Valtanna, Untersays and Obersays. In 1880 the municipality separated from Trimmis to become an independent municipality. However, in 2008 Says merged back into Trimmis.

== Demographics ==
Says has a population (as of 2007) of 158, of which 2.5% are foreign nationals. Over the last 10 years the population has decreased at a rate of -1.9%. Most of the population (as of 2000) speaks German (99.3%), with the rest speaking Romansh (0.7%).

As of 2000, the gender distribution of the population was 48.1% male and 51.9% female. The age distribution, as of 2000, in Says is; 12 children or 7.8% of the population are between 0 and 9 years old. 21 teenagers or 13.7% are 10 to 14, and 13 teenagers or 8.5% are 15 to 19. Of the adult population, 14 people or 9.2% of the population are between 20 and 29 years old. 14 people or 9.2% are 30 to 39, 40 people or 26.1% are 40 to 49, and 11 people or 7.2% are 50 to 59. The senior population distribution is 10 people or 6.5% of the population are between 60 and 69 years old, 12 people or 7.8% are 70 to 79, there are 5 people or 3.3% who are 80 to 89, and there is 1 person who is 90 to 99.

In the 2007 federal election the most popular party was the SVP which received 45.7% of the vote. The next three most popular parties were the SP (27.2%), the local, small right-wing parties (13%) and the FDP (8.7%).

The entire Swiss population is generally well educated. In Says about 81.9% of the population (between age 25-64) have completed either non-mandatory upper secondary education or additional higher education (either University or a Fachhochschule).

Says has an unemployment rate of 0.1%. As of 2005, there were 18 people employed in the primary economic sector and about 8 businesses involved in this sector. Two people are employed in the secondary sector and there are 2 businesses in this sector. Seven people are employed in the tertiary sector, with 3 businesses in this sector.

The historical population is given in the following table:

year	population
1860	205
1900	161
1950	126
2000	153
