= Johann Andreas Sprecher von Bernegg (politician, born 1811) =

Swiss politician (1811–1862)

- Born: 3 November 1811; Maienfeld, Switzerland
- Died: 17 August 1862 (aged 50); Davos, Switzerland
- Occupations: Lawyer; politician
- Spouse: Barbara Albertini

Johann Andreas Sprecher von Bernegg (also Johann Andreas Sprecher; 3 November 1811 – 17 August 1862) was a Swiss lawyer and politician from the canton of Grisons. He was mayor of Chur, a member of the cantonal government, and sat in the Council of States and the National Council.

== Biography ==
Johann Andreas Sprecher von Bernegg was a member of the Sprecher von Bernegg family. He was the son of Jakob. He married Barbara Albertini, daughter of Christoph Joseph, a member of the cantonal government (Regierungsrat). His sons were Hermann and Arthur.

He attended the gymnasium in Chur and studied law, languages and history in Munich, Berlin, Lausanne and Paris. From 1832 he was a lawyer in Chur. He was a member of the Grand Council in 1841–1843 and 1851–1853, landammann in Klosters in 1842–1843, mayor (Bürgermeister) of Chur in 1851 and 1853, and a member of the cantonal government in 1852 and 1856. He sat in the Council of States in 1853–1854 and 1860–1861, and in the National Council from 1857 to 1860. In 1855 he drafted the code of civil procedure, and in 1862 he was a member of the committee drafting the civil code of the Grisons. He was an educated politician with liberal-conservative leanings, and in Bern he belonged to the political center. He held the rank of colonel.

== Bibliography ==
- Bündnerisches Monatsblatt, 1862, 139–140
- E. Gruner, Die schweizerische Bundesversammlung 1848–1920, 1, 1966, 627–628
- P. Metz, Geschichte des Kantons Graubünden, 2, 1991
