= Fortunat Sprecher von Bernegg =

Grisons historian (1585–1647)

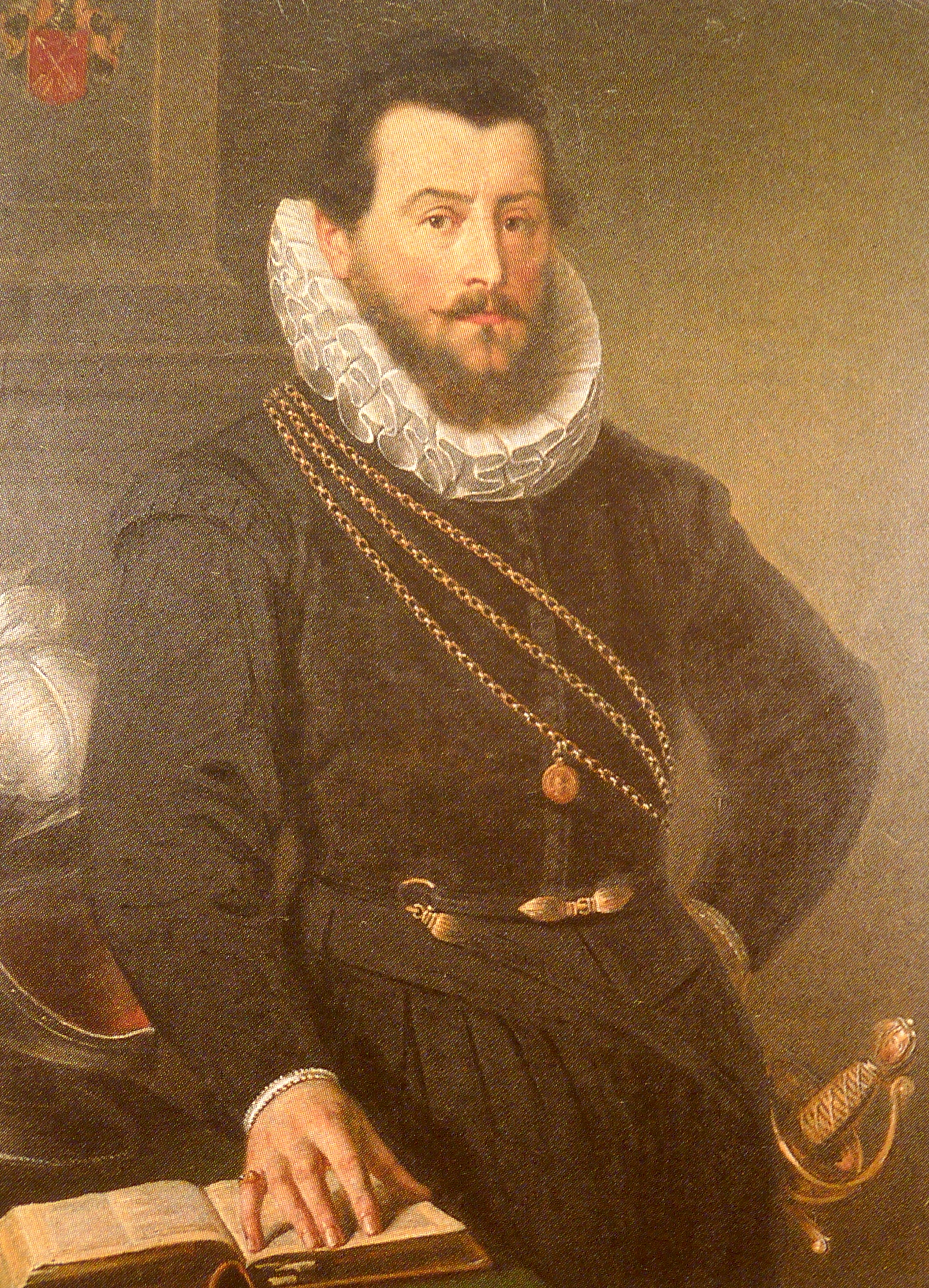
- Portrait by Johann Friedrich Dietler, 19th century
- Born: 9 January 1585; Davos, Three Leagues
- Died: 14 January 1647 (aged 62); Chur, Three Leagues
- Education: University of Orléans
- Occupations: Historian; diplomat
- Notable work: Pallas Rhaetica armata et togata (1617)
- Spouses: Elisabeth Sebregonzi; Ludovica von Planta

Fortunat Sprecher von Bernegg (also Fortunat Sprecher; 9 January 1585 – 14 January 1647) was a historian and diplomat of the Three Leagues. He was repeatedly an envoy of the Three Leagues and held offices in the Valtellina and in Chiavenna. He became famous for two historical works first published in Latin, the Rhaetian chronicle Pallas Rhaetica armata et togata (1617) and a contemporary account of the Bündner Wirren (1629), and for his map of Graubünden (1618).

== Biography ==
Fortunat Sprecher von Bernegg was a member of the Sprecher von Bernegg family. He was the son of Florian Sprecher and the brother of Johann. He married first Elisabeth Sebregonzi, daughter of Martin, from Berbenno in the Valtellina, and second Ludovica von Planta, daughter of Peter, a captain in Venetian service.

He was taught Latin by private tutors and attended the gymnasium in Chur. After studies in places including Basel, he obtained a doctorate in both laws from the University of Orléans in 1606. In 1612 he served as general proveditor (Generalproveditor) and colonel in the Valtellina, and in 1617–1619, for part of 1623, and in 1625–1627 as commissioner (commissari) in Chiavenna. He was repeatedly an envoy of the Three Leagues, for example in April 1621, when he went with Gilli Maissen the Younger and Fortunat von Juvalta to Archduke Leopold V of Austria at Innsbruck and Imst. In 1616 he was made a knight of the Order of Saint Mark.

Sprecher became famous for two historical works first published in Latin: the Rhaetian chronicle (Pallas Rhaetica armata et togata, 1617; published in German in 1672) and the history of the troubles and wars (Historia motuum et bellorum [...], 1629), a contemporary account of the Bündner Wirren. He also became famous for his map of Graubünden (Alpinae seu foederatae Rhaetiae [...], 1618), which set the standard. In his publications from 1615 onwards he introduced the noble predicate von Bernegg, which had been granted to his father in 1582 by King Henry III of France. Johann Heinrich Waser's arbitration of 1644, which reduced the privileged position of Davos within the League of the Ten Jurisdictions, so offended Sprecher's sense of justice that he gave up his work as a chronicler.

== Works ==
- "Davoser Chronik" (with F. von Sprecher), in Bündner Monatsblatt, 1953, 314–375
- Rätische Chronik, new edition by A. von Sprecher, 2 vols., 1998 (2nd ed. 1999)

== Bibliography ==
- A. von Sprecher, "Aus der Jugendzeit des Geschichtsschreibers Fortunat Sprecher von Bernegg", in Bündnerisches Monatsblatt, 1935, 321–336
- Stammbaum der Familie Sprecher von Bernegg, 2 vols., [1936] (with a list of works)
- H. Schmid, "Bündner Chronisten des 17. Jahrhunderts", in Bedeutende Bündner aus fünf Jahrhunderten, 1, 1970, 129–146
- R. Feller, E. Bonjour, Geschichtsschreibung der Schweiz vom Spätmittelalter zur Neuzeit, 1, 2nd ed., 1979, 336–339
- F. Pieth, Bündnergeschichte, 2nd ed., 1982, 234–235, 247–248
- Handbuch der Bündner Geschichte, 2, 2000, 188

=== Archives ===
- Family archives, Maienfeld
