= Johann Andreas Sprecher von Bernegg (politician, born 1702) =

Grisons politician (1702–1765)

- Born: 21 December 1702; Chur, Three Leagues
- Died: 15 January 1765 (aged 62); Grüsch, Three Leagues
- Occupations: Politician; military officer
- Spouse: Margaretha Katharina von Salis-Grüsch
- Children: Anton Herkules
- Relatives: Salomon Sprecher von Bernegg (brother)

Johann Andreas Sprecher von Bernegg (also Johann Andreas Sprecher; 21 December 1702 – 15 January 1765) was a politician and officer from the Three Leagues. Between 1735 and 1762 he was landammann of Davos for fifteen years, and in 1747, 1755 and 1763 he was Bundslandammann, the landammann of the League of the Ten Jurisdictions. From 1743 to 1750 he served as a captain in imperial service.

== Biography ==
Johann Andreas Sprecher von Bernegg was born in Chur on 21 December 1702, a member of the Sprecher von Bernegg family. He was the son of Johann Andreas, a landammann, and Maria Terz, and the brother of Salomon. In 1735 he married Margaretha Katharina von Salis-Grüsch, daughter of Ulysses, Bundslandammann. His son was Anton Herkules.

Between 1735 and 1762 Sprecher von Bernegg was landammann of Davos for fifteen years, and in 1747, 1755 and 1763 Bundslandammann of the League of the Ten Jurisdictions. From 1743 to 1750 he served as a captain in imperial service, first in the Schauenstein regiment and then in that of his brother. He died in Grüsch on 15 January 1765. An endowment he made allowed the church organ of Wiesen to be built in 1774.

== Bibliography ==
- Stammbaum der Familie Sprecher von Bernegg, 2 vols., [1936]
