= 1872 Swiss constitutional referendum =

- 12 May 1872
- Total revision of the Constitution

Results
Choice	Votes	%
Yes	255,609	49.49%
No	260,859	50.51%
Valid votes	516,468	100.00%
Invalid or blank votes	0	0.00%
Total votes	516,468	100.00%

A constitutional referendum was held in Switzerland on 12 May 1872. The new constitution was rejected by 50.5% of voters and a majority of cantons.

== Background ==
In order to pass, any amendments to the constitution needed a double majority; a majority of the popular vote and majority of the cantons. The decision of each canton was based on the vote in that canton. Full cantons counted as one vote, whilst half cantons counted as half.

== Results ==
Choice	Popular vote		Cantons		
Choice	Votes	%	Full	Half	Total
For	255,609	49.5	8	2	9
Against	260,859	50.5	11	4	13
Invalid/blank votes		–	–	–	–
Total	516,468	100	19	6	22
Source: Nohlen & Stöver
