= Jakob Sprecher von Bernegg =

Officer in Dutch service (1756–1822)

- Born: 26 November 1756; Bergen op Zoom, Brabant
- Died: 5 March 1822 (aged 65); Grüsch, Switzerland
- Spouse: Dorothea Sprecher von Bernegg
- Military career
- Allegiance: Dutch Republic; United Kingdom of the Netherlands
- Rank: Major general

Jakob Sprecher von Bernegg (26 November 1756 – 5 March 1822) was a Swiss officer in Dutch service. He accompanied the hereditary stadtholder of the Netherlands on his flight to England, became proprietor of the Swiss regiment von Sprecher in 1814, and was made a major general in 1816.

== Biography ==
Jakob Sprecher von Bernegg was a member of the Sprecher von Bernegg family. He was the son of Johann Andreas, a lieutenant colonel in the Schmid von Grüneck regiment, and Jakoba Backer, from Nijmegen. In 1807 he married Dorothea Sprecher von Bernegg, daughter of Anton Herkules. His grandson was Theophil Sprecher von Bernegg.

He entered Dutch service very young, in the Bentinck regiment, and became a captain at 18 and a major at 28. After the defeat at the Battle of Fleurus in 1794, he accompanied the hereditary stadtholder of the Netherlands on his flight to England, and he was a lieutenant colonel of the Dutch exile troops on the Isle of Wight. In 1814 he became proprietor (Inhaber) of the Swiss regiment von Sprecher. In 1815 he was in Dutch pay under King William I, and in 1816 he became a major general. He founded the Clus-Maienfeld line of the family.

== Bibliography ==
- J. von Sprecher, "Die Jeninser im kgl. niederländischen Regiment v. Sprecher Nr. 31, 1814–1829", in Bündner Monatsblatt, 1973, 74–87
- D. Sprecher, Generalstabschef Theophil Sprecher von Bernegg, 2000
