= Bernegg Castle, Graubünden =

Castle in Calfreisen, Switzerland

Bernegg Castle
- Calfreisen, Arosa
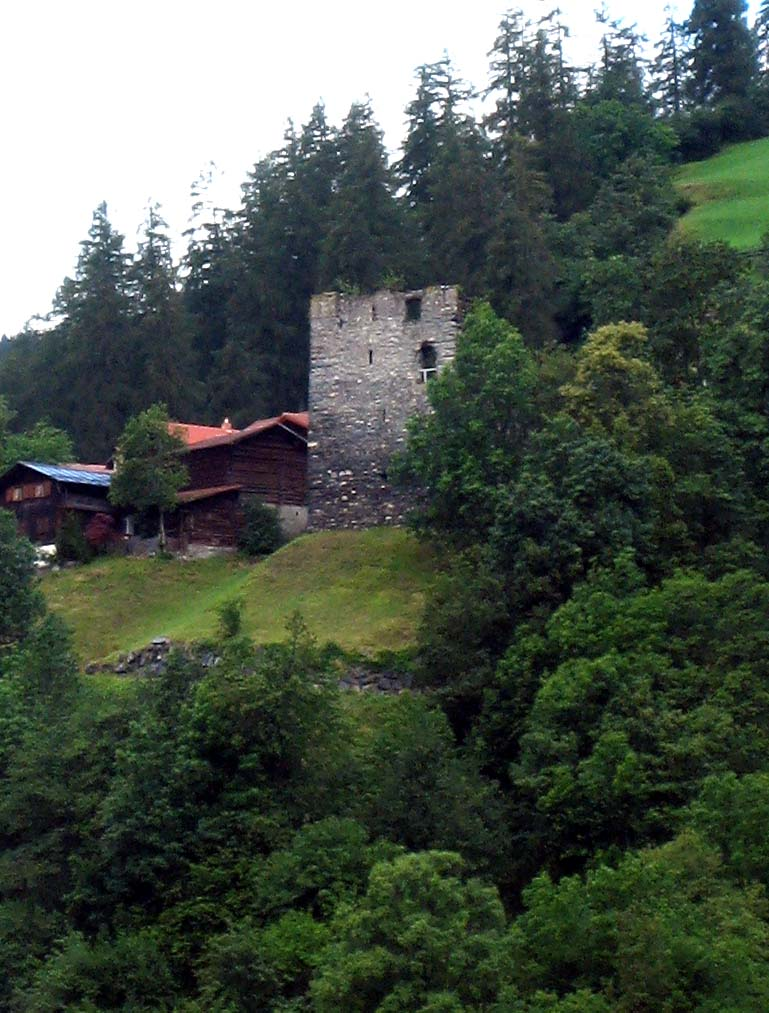
- Bernegg Castle above Schanfiggerstrasse

Site information
- Type: hill castle
- Code: CH-GR
- Condition: ruin

Location
- Location within Canton of Graubünden Location within Switzerland
- Coordinates: 46°50′29″N 9°35′47.3″E
- Height: 1'245 m

Site history
- Built: about 1260
- Materials: rubble stone

Garrison information
- Occupants: ministeriales

Bernegg Castle is a ruined castle in the village of Calfreisen in the municipality of Arosa of the Canton of Graubünden in Switzerland.

== History ==
Bernegg Castle was built in the mid to late 13th century for the Freiherr von Calfreisen, though it was probably called Calfreisen Castle until the 15th century. A mention of Otto von Calfreisen in 1231 indicates that the family lived in the area before the castle was built. They may have lived in an earlier castle which was replaced in the mid 13th century or in the village. In 1259 and again in 1286 the Freiherr was mentioned in the castle. After the extinction of the Calfreisen family in the 14th century, the castle was acquired by the Unterwegen family. Hans von Underwegen was mentioned at the castle in 1386, though they may have acquired it earlier. In 1428 it was acquired by the Sprecher family, who changed the name to Bernegg. The castle then vanishes from the historical record until the mid 16th century when it was described as a ruin.

== Castle site ==
The castle ruin is located on a hill south of Calfreisen village. The palas is a rectangular building about 11 by 13 meters (36 ft × 43 ft) and four stories tall. The walls are 2.4–2 m (7.9–6.6 ft) thick at the base, tapering to 1.8 m (5.9 ft) on the upper levels. The ground floor probably served as the castle's cellar. The second story has several small arrow slits in the walls. One of the arrow slits on the south wall was expanded into a door way which now serves as the entrance into the castle. The original high entrance on the third story south wall is still intact. The remains of a brick oven can be seen on the fourth story.

== Gallery ==
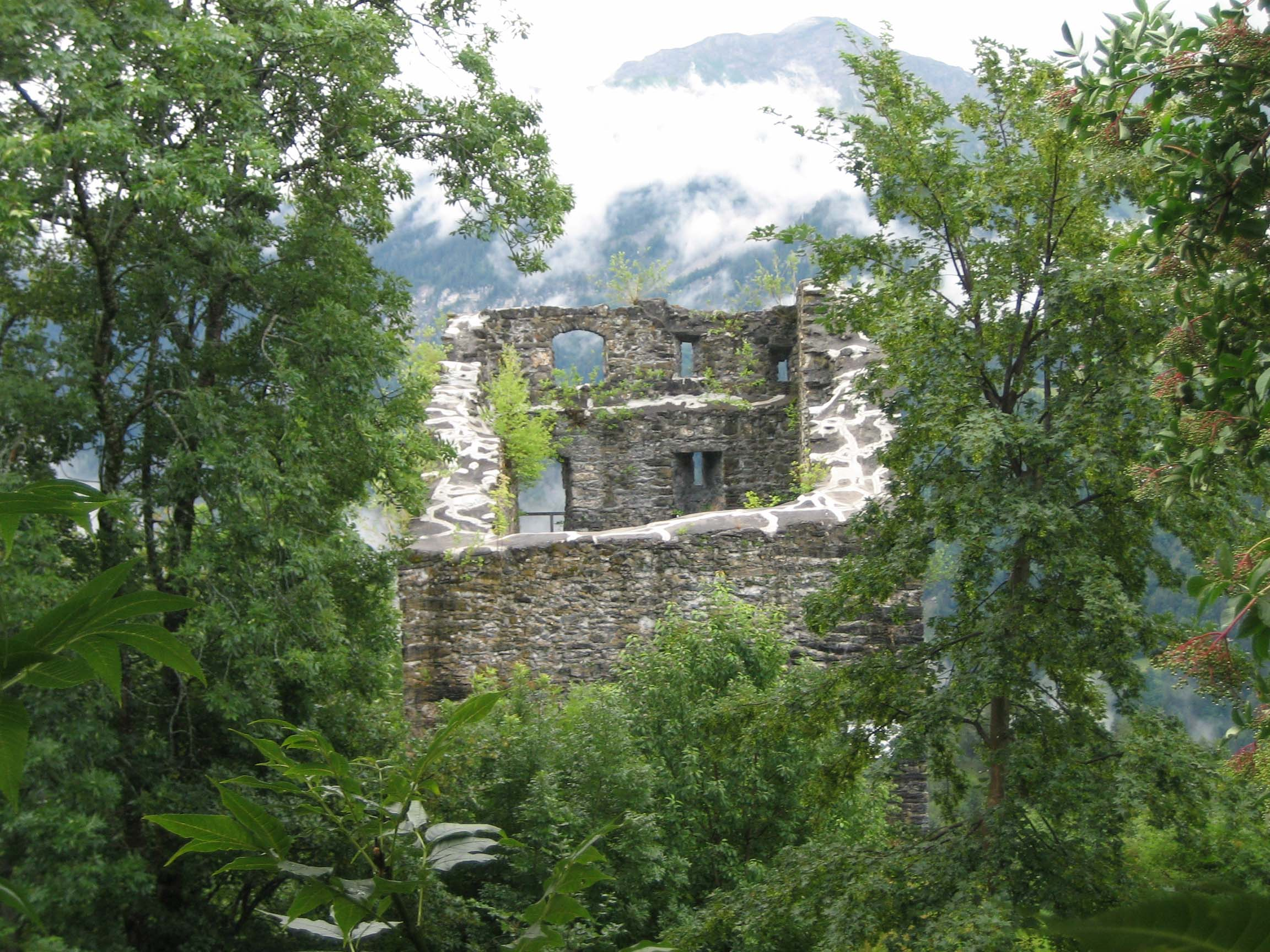
North side

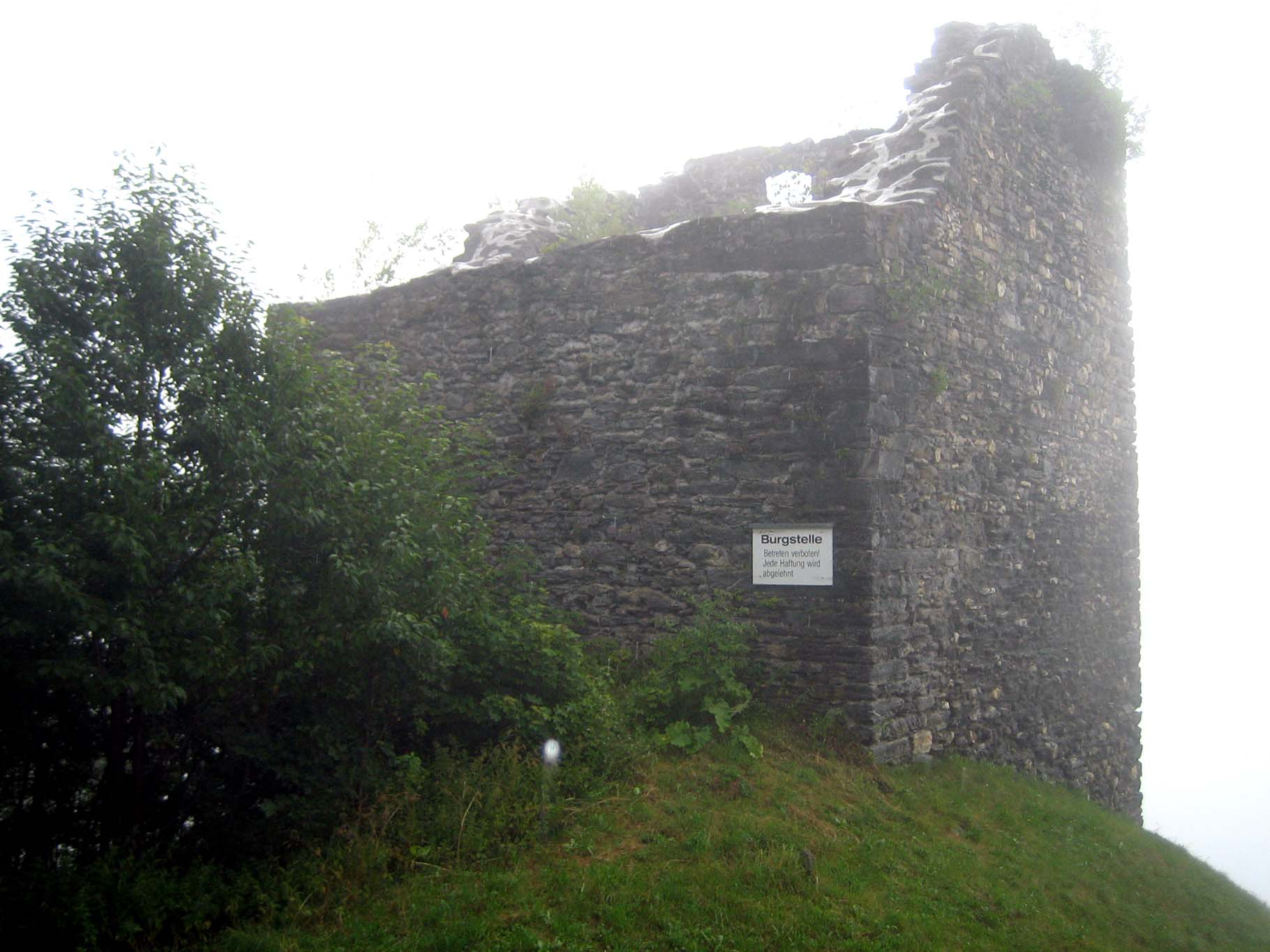
View from the north-west

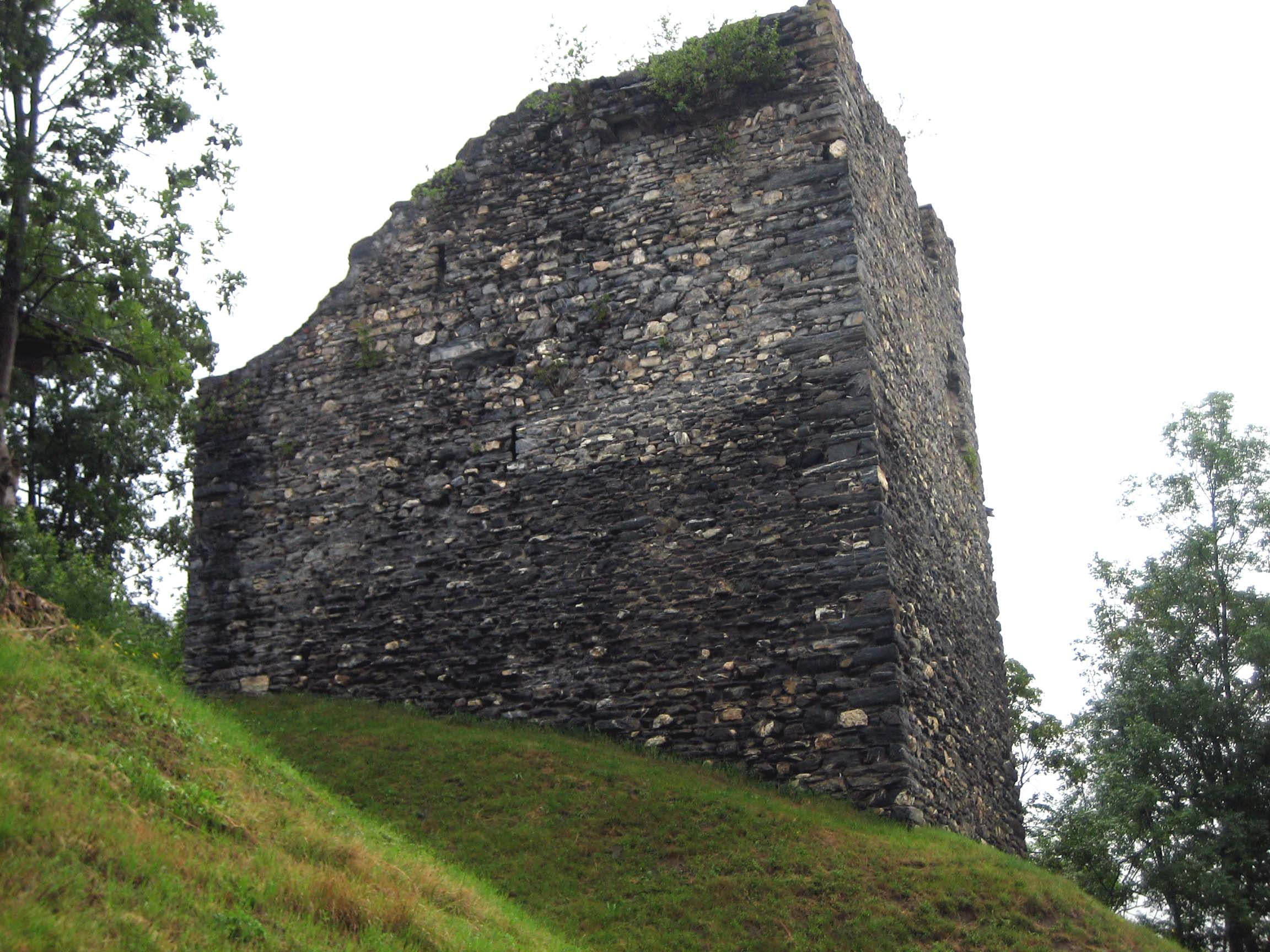
South-west side

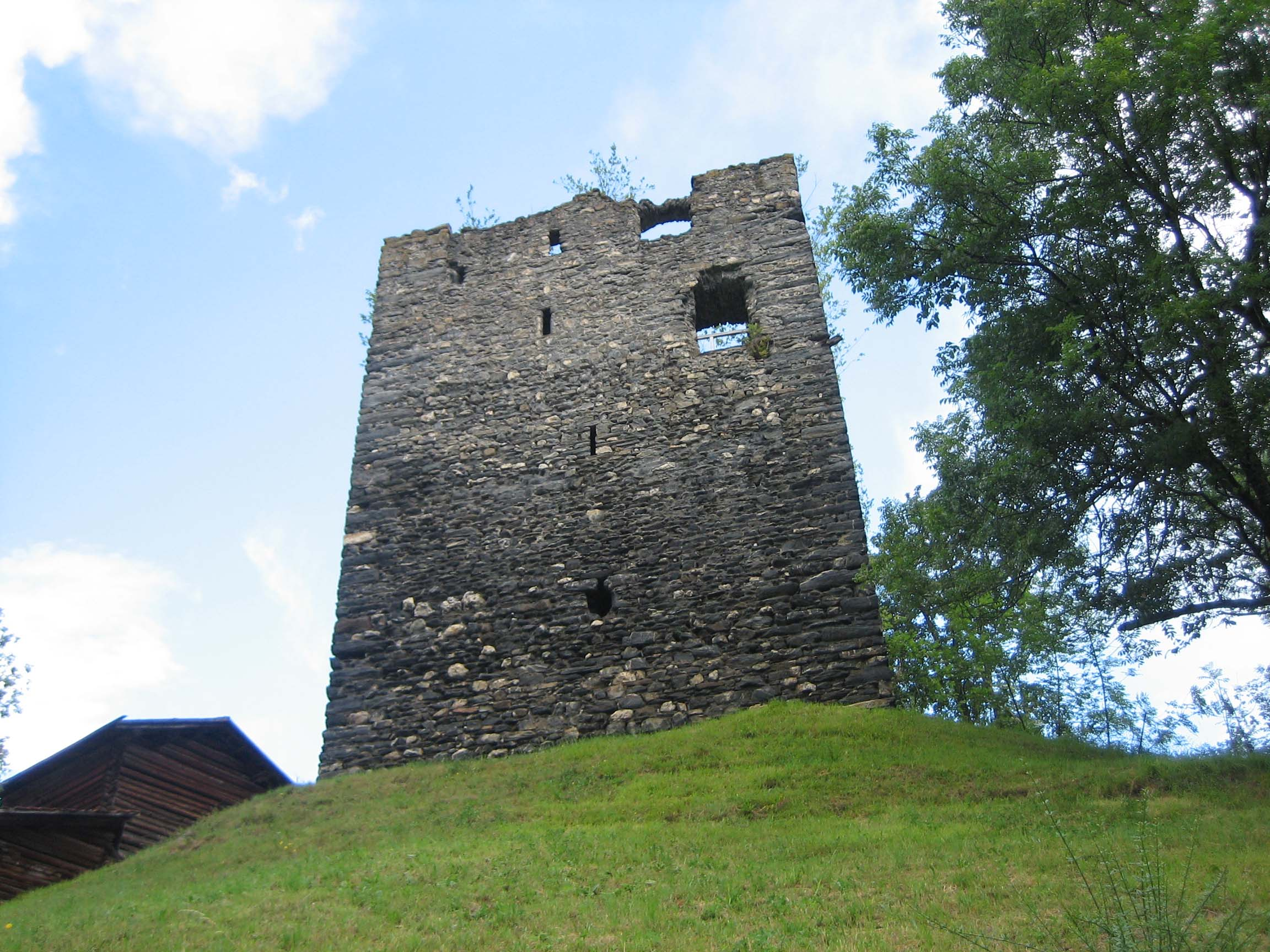
South side

== See also ==
- List of castles in Switzerland
