= Sprecher von Bernegg family =

Swiss noble family from the Grisons

The Sprecher von Bernegg family (also Sprecher or von Sprecher) is a Walser family of leading magistrates (Häuptergeschlecht) of the League of the Ten Jurisdictions (Davos stock), with its ancestral seat at Strassberg in the Fondei, in the Schanfigg. The noble predicate von Bernegg, granted by King Henry III of France in 1582, was introduced by the historian Fortunat in his publications from 1615. From the end of the 16th century the family held a leading political position in the league, and 15 of its members held the office of Bundslandammann (landammann of the league) between 1582 and 1850. Several of its members reached the highest military ranks in foreign service and in the Swiss Army, and several emigrated to the United States and Argentina.

== History ==
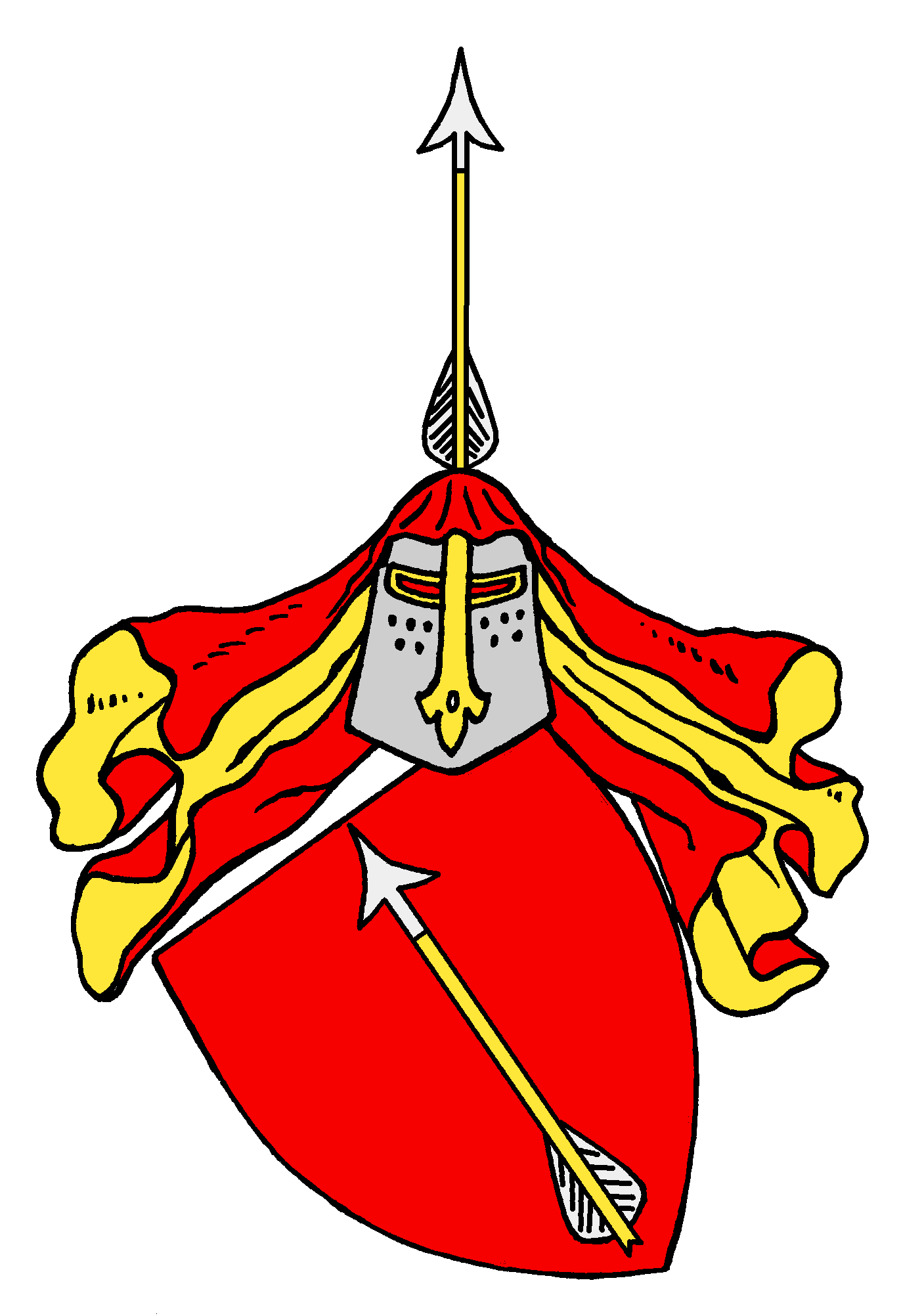
Sprecher coat of arms

The family is of Walser origin, and its ancestral seat was at Strassberg in the Fondei, in the Schanfigg. The progenitor of all its lines is Joos (c. 1340–1390). The family name corresponds to the short form of the Walser title of office for a juror or advocate. The historian Fortunat introduced the noble predicate von Bernegg in his publications from 1615. It had been granted to his father Florian in 1582 by King Henry III of France, in reference to the old tower house owned by the family near Calfreisen in the Schanfigg.

At the turn of the 14th and 15th centuries the family branched out and established numerous seats in Davos, the Schanfigg, Chur, Churwalden, Says, Ems, Haldenstein, Trimmis, Zizers, the Prättigau, the Chur Rhine Valley and the St. Gallen Rhine Valley, and the Tamina valley. Owing to its nobility, its marriages, and its extensive landholdings, the Davos stock attained a leading political position in the League of the Ten Jurisdictions from the end of the 16th century. From 1582 to 1850, a total of 15 members of the family held the office of Bundslandammann, which also included the office of landammann of the jurisdiction (Gerichtsgemeinde) of Davos. Members of the family served on missions abroad more than a dozen times. In the competition for the lucrative offices in the Valtellina and the bailiwick of Maienfeld, the Sprechers ranked third, behind the established Salis and Planta families.

Until the 20th century, several members of the family reached the highest military ranks both in foreign service and in the Swiss Army: Salomon from the Davos branch, some members of the Luzein branch, and Jakob, Arthur, and Theophil from the Clus-Maienfeld branch.

Several members of the family emigrated to the United States and Argentina. Johann (Jann, 1823–1900), who emigrated in 1846, founded the Jenins line in the state of Wisconsin. The forester Heinrich (1820–1864), who left Chur in 1848, became the progenitor of the Senftenau line in the states of Virginia and Ohio. Georg (1884–1950), who emigrated to Argentina in 1902, was the progenitor of the Luzein line in Allen on the Río Negro.

== Bibliography ==
- Schweizerisches Geschlechterbuch, 1, 548–555
- Stammbaum der Familie Sprecher von Bernegg, 2 vols., [1936]

=== Archives ===
- Family archives, Maienfeld
- State Archives of Graubünden, Chur
