= Theophil Sprecher von Bernegg =

Swiss general and politician (1850–1927)

Theophil Andreas Luzius Sprecher von Bernegg (27 April 1850, Maienfeld – 6 December 1927) was a Swiss politician and military Chief of the General Staff (1905–1919).

At the outbreak of World War I, he declined the office of General, which led to Colonel Ulrich Wille being elected.

Theophil von Sprecher at a parade in front of the Federal Palace in Bern

Sprecher was depicted on a Swiss stamp in 1950. A complete edition of his writings was published in 2002.

== Works ==
- Daniel Sprecher, ed. (2002). Generalstabschef Theophil Sprecher von Bernegg, Gesammelte Schriften (in German). Zurich: Verlag Neue Zürcher Zeitung. ISBN 978-3-85823-967-9.
