= Killias =

Killias is a surname. Notable people with the surname include:

- Eduard Killias (1829–1891), Swiss physician and naturalist
- Martin Killias (born 1948), Swiss criminologist
- Ulla Engeberg Killias (1945–1995), Swedish/Swiss painter

== See also ==
- Killian
