= Meinrad Schütter =

Swiss composer (1910–2006)

Meinrad Schütter (21 September 1910 – 12 January 2006) was a Swiss composer.

Born in Coire in the Swiss Alps, Schütter studied at the Zürich Conservatory, and privately (via correspondence course) with Willy Burkhard during World War II. He later attended the classes of Paul Hindemith at Zürich University, from 1950 to 1954, and received additional support from the conductor Hermann Scherchen.

He wrote choral music, two masses, the opera Medea, ballet music, a symphony and other orchestral works - such as the Five Variants and Metamorphosis and the Ricercare for orchestra - many songs with piano or instrumental accompaniment, piano music, chamber music (including a string quartet) and a piano concerto, which has been recorded.

His style, initially neoclassical, emphasized polyphony and ranged from tonal to atonal, serial and aleatory in technique. After his retirement, Schütter renewed his activity as a composer with several dozen new songs, as well as further orchestral and chamber works.
