= Chur =

Capital of the Grisons, Switzerland

- Municipality
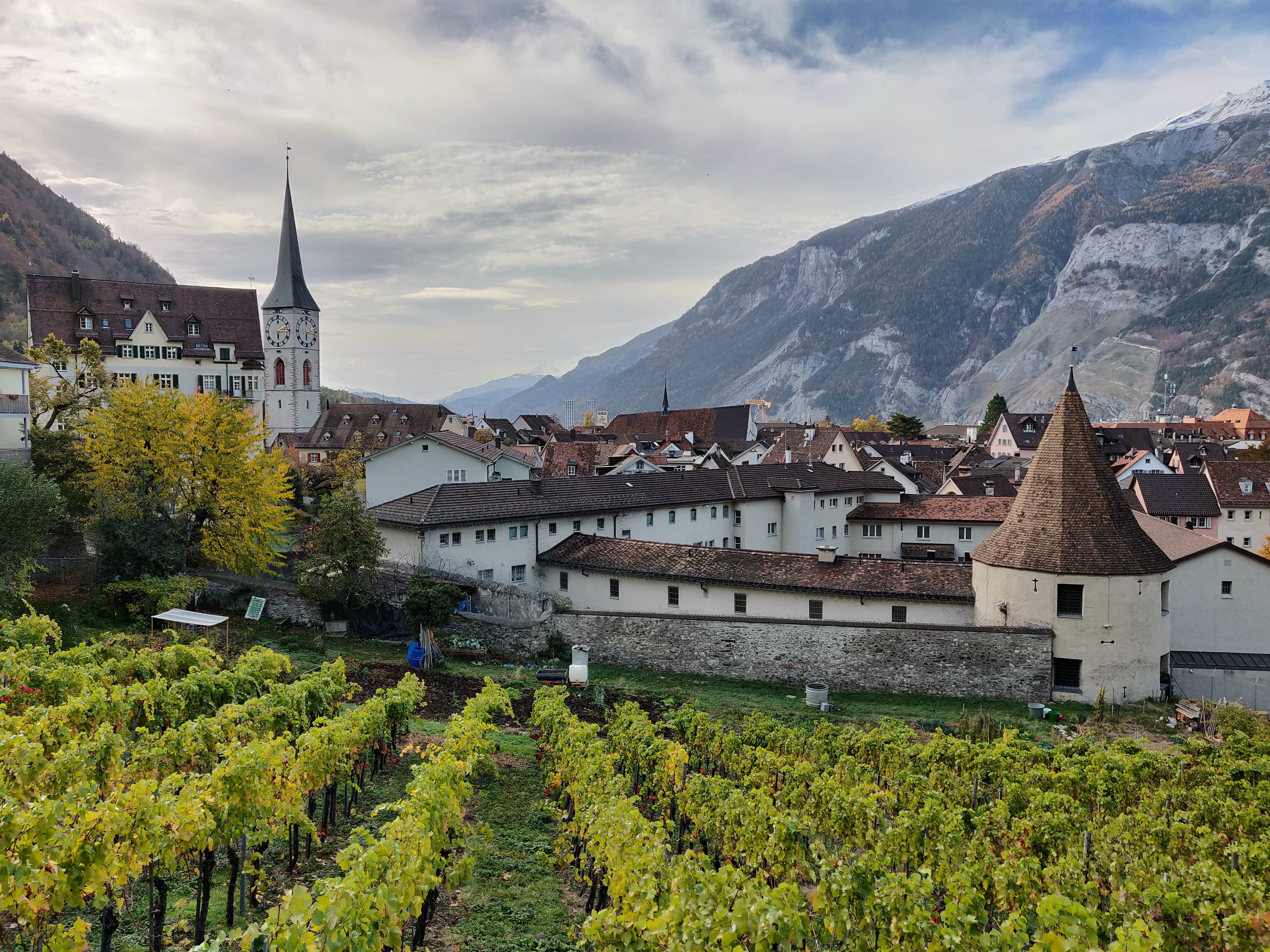
- Chur, looking upstream, to the west

- Flag Coat of arms
- Location of Chur
- Location within Switzerland Location within Canton of Grisons
- Coordinates: 46°51′N 9°32′E
- Country: Switzerland
- Canton: Grisons
- District: Plessur

Government
  - Executive: Stadtrat with 3 members
  - Mayor: Stadtpräsident (list); Hans Martin Meuli FDP.The Liberals (as of June 2024)
  - Parliament: Gemeinderat with 21 members

Area
  - Total: 54.26 km^{2} (20.95 sq mi)
- Elevation (Postplatz): 592 m (1,942 ft)
- Highest elevation (Tschaggo): 2,223 m (7,293 ft)
- Lowest elevation (Rhein (Halbmil)): 551 m (1,808 ft)

Population (2024-12-31)
  - Total: 39,984
  - Density: 736.9/km^{2} (1,909/sq mi)
- Demonym: German: Churer(in)
- Time zone: UTC+01:00 (CET)
  - Summer (DST): UTC+02:00 (CEST)
- Postal codes: 7000 Chur, 7026 Maladers, 7074 Malix (partly)
- SFOS number: 3901
- ISO 3166 code: CH-GR
- Localities: Altstadt, Sand, Kasernenquartier, Industriegebiet, Loestrasse-Lürlibad, Haldenstein, Maladers, Masans, Praden, Rheinquartier, Tschiertschen
- Surrounded by: Arosa, Churwalden, Domat/Ems, Felsberg, Malix, Trimmis, Untervaz, Pfäfers
- Twin towns: Bad Homburg (Germany), Cabourg (France), Mayrhofen (Austria), Mondorf-les-Bains (Luxembourg), Terracina (Italy), Olathe (United States)
- Website: chur.ch

Chur (Note: Swiss Standard German: [ˈkuːr] (locally) or [ˈxuːr]; Sursilvan: Cuera [ˈkweːʁə]; Vallader: Cuoira [ˈkuɔ̯jrɐ]; Puter and Rumantsch Grischun: Cuira [ˈkujrɐ]; Surmiran: Coira; Sutsilvan: Cuera or Cuira; Italian: Coira [ˈkɔira]; French: Coire [kwaʁ]; Latin: Curia, Curia Rhaetorum or Curia Raetorum.) is the capital and largest town of the Swiss canton of the Grisons and lies in the Grisonian Rhine Valley, where the Rhine turns towards the north, in the northern part of the canton. The city, on the right bank of the Rhine, is reputedly the oldest town in Switzerland.

On 1 January 2020 the former municipality of Maladers merged into Chur and on 1 January 2021 Haldenstein also merged. On 1 January 2025 the former municipality of Tschiertschen-Praden merged into Chur.

== History ==
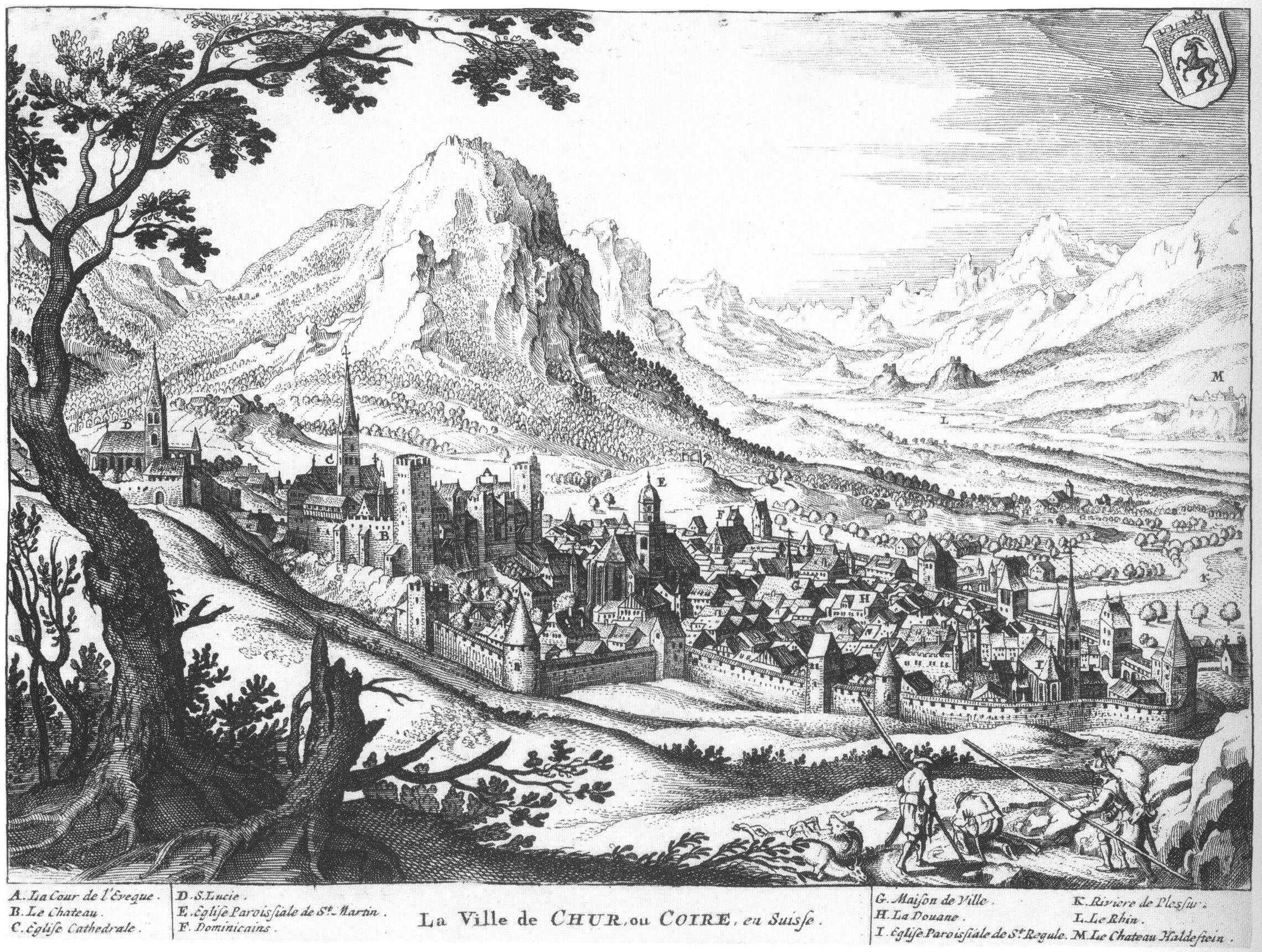
Chur in 1642, by Matthäus Merian

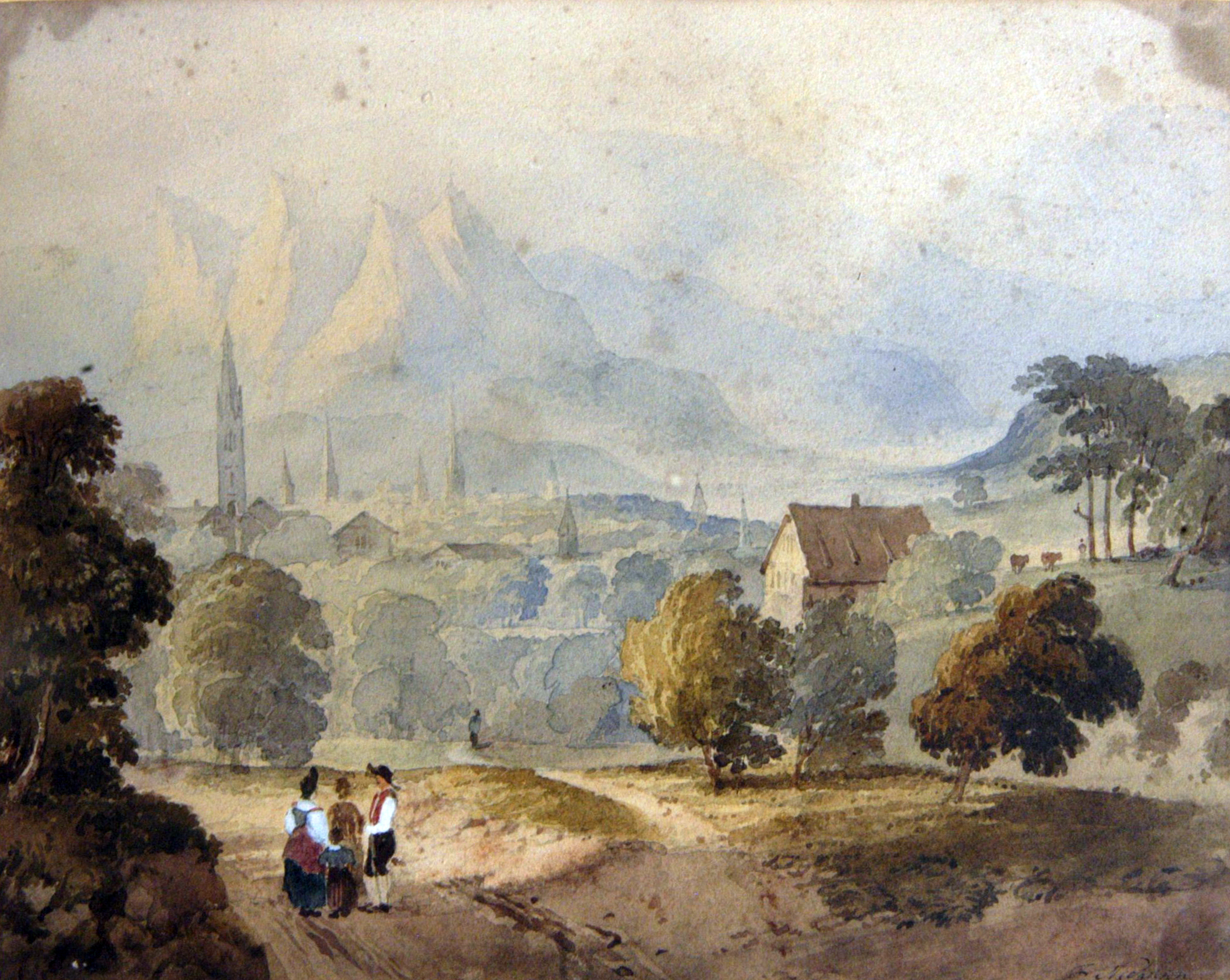
Watercolour drawing of Chur by Francis Nicholson (1753–1844)

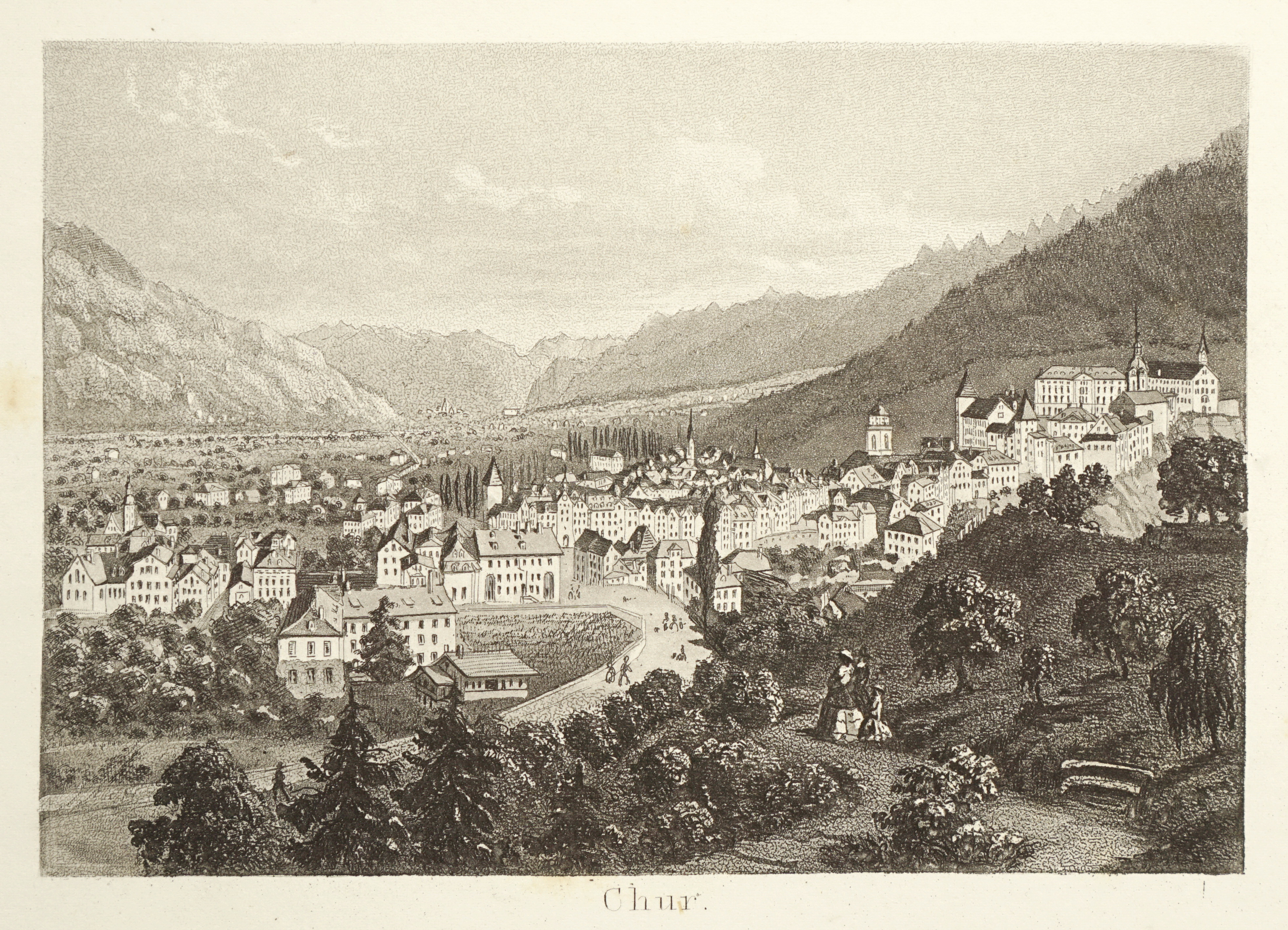
Chur c. 1870. Etching by Heinrich Müller

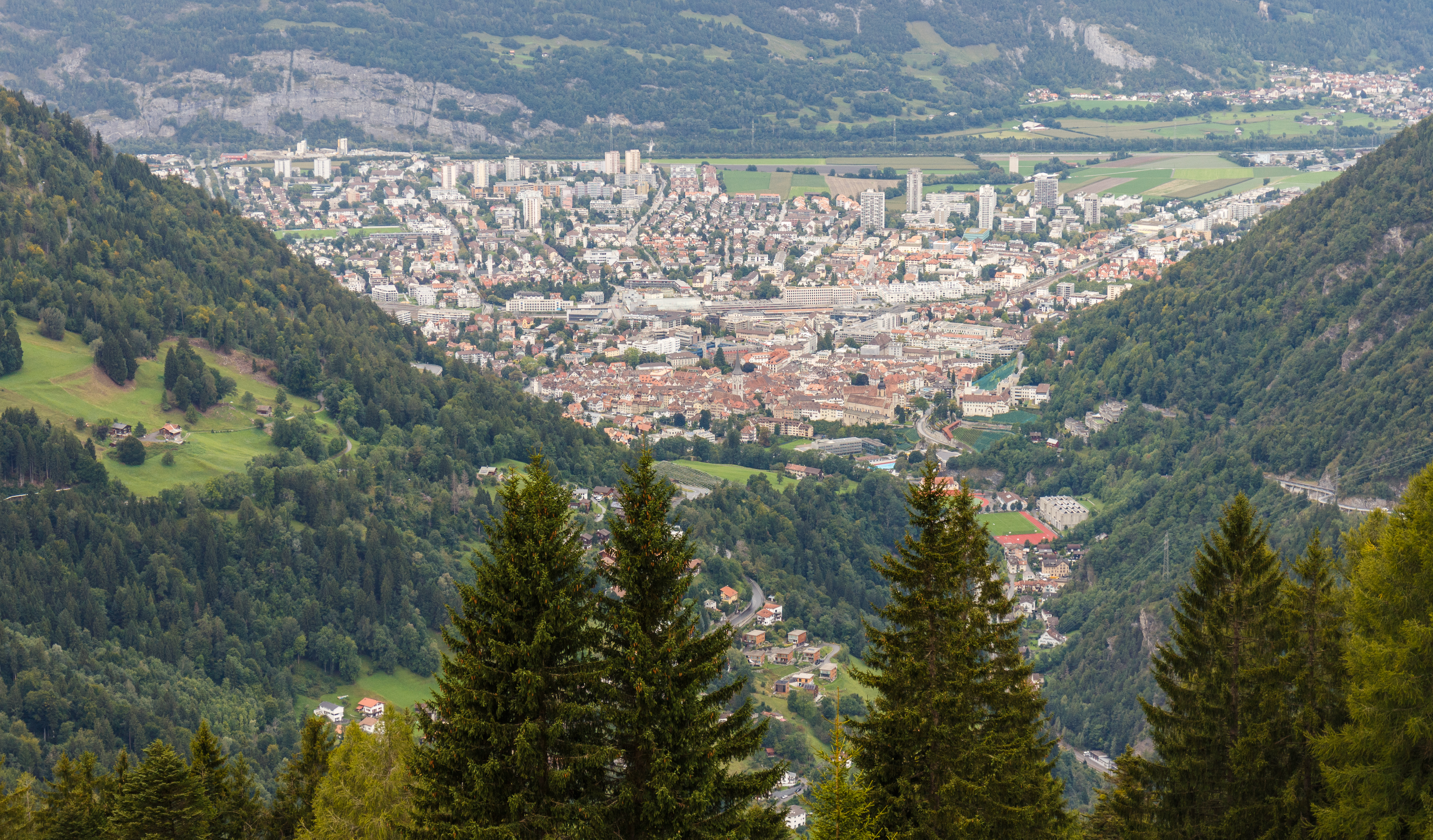
View of Chur

Archaeological evidence of settlement at the site, in the Eastern Alps, goes back as far as the Pfyn culture (3900–3500 BC), making Chur one of the oldest settlements in Switzerland. Remains and objects from the Bronze and Iron Ages have also been found in the eastern sector of the centre of the current city. These include Bronze-Age Urnfield and Laugen-Melaun settlements from 1300 to 800 BC and Iron-Age settlements from the 5th to 3rd centuries BC.

The Roman Empire conquered the area that then came to be known as the Roman province of Raetia in 15 BC. Under emperor Diocletian (late 3rd century AD), the existing settlement of Curia Raetorum (later Chur) was made the capital of the newly established province of Raetia prima.

In the 4th century Chur became the seat of the first Christian bishopric north of the Alps. Despite a legend assigning its foundation to an alleged British king, St. Lucius, the first known bishop is one Asinio in AD 451. The bishop soon acquired great temporal powers, especially after 831 when his dominions were made dependent on the Empire alone.

After the invasion of the Ostrogoths it may have been renamed Theodoricopolis; in the 6th century it was conquered by the Franks. The city suffered several invasions, by the Magyars in 925–926, when the cathedral was destroyed, and by the Saracens (940 and 954), but afterwards it flourished thanks to its location where the roads from several major Alpine transit routes come together and continue down the Rhine. The routes had already been used under the Romans but acquired greater importance under the Ottonian dynasty of the Holy Roman Empire. Emperor Otto I granted the town the right to collect tolls in 952 and appointed his vassal Hartpert as bishop of Chur in 958, giving the bishopric further privileges. In 1170 the bishop became a prince-bishop and kept total control over the road between Chur and Chiavenna.

In the 13th century the town had some 1,300 inhabitants and was surrounded by a line of walls. In the 14th century at least six fires damaged or destroyed the monasteries of St. Luzi and St. Nicolai and St Martin's Church and twice destroyed much of the town. The Gotteshausbund (League of the House of God) was formed in 1367 in Chur to resist the rising power of the Bishopric of Chur and the House of Habsburg. Chur was the chief town of the League and one of the places the League's assemblies met regularly. A burgomaster (mayor) of Chur is first mentioned in 1413. The bishop's residence was attacked by the inhabitants in 1418 and 1422, when a series of concessions were wrung out of him.

On 27 April 1464 most of the town was destroyed in a fire, which only the bishop's estates and St. Luzi monastery survived. With the bishop's power waning as he came increasingly under the influence of the nearby Habsburg County of Tyrol, the citizens sent a delegation to Emperor Frederick III. The Emperor reconfirmed the historic rights of Chur and also granted them extensive new rights which freed the city from the bishop's power. In 1465 the citizens wrote a constitution that granted all governmental power to Chur's guilds. All government positions were restricted to guild members, allowing the guilds to regulate all aspects of life in Chur. Since guild membership had become the only route to political power, local patricians and nobles quickly became guild members, often joining the winemakers guild.

The Chur-led League of the House of God allied with the Grey League and the League of the Ten Jurisdictions in 1471 to form the Three Leagues. In 1489 Chur obtained the right to have a tribunal of its own but never had the title of Free Imperial City. In 1497–98, concerned about Habsburg expansion and with the Bishop of Chur quarrelling with Austria, the Three Leagues formed an alliance with the Swiss Confederation. In 1499 the Swabian War broke out between the Three Leagues and Austria and quickly expanded to include the Confederation. During the war troops from Chur fought under the Bishop's Vogt Heinrich Ammann in the Lower Engadin, in Prättigau and near Balzers. Troops from Chur also took part in the 1512 invasion of the Valtellina and the Second Musso War in 1530–31.

Aerial view from 300 m by Walter Mittelholzer (1925)

In 1523 Johannes (Dorfmann) Comander was appointed parish priest of St Martin's Church and began preaching the new faith of the Protestant Reformation. It spread rapidly and by 1525 the bishop had fled the city and Protestant services were taking place in the churches of St Martin and St Regula. The Ilanz Articles of 1524 and 1526 allowed each resident of the Three Leagues to choose their religion and sharply reduced the political and secular power of the Bishop of Chur and all monasteries in League territory. By 1527 all of Chur except the bishop's estates had adopted the Reformation. On 23 January 1529 Abbot Theodul Schlegel was publicly beheaded. Bishop Thomas Planta, a friend of Charles Borromeo, tried, but without success, to suppress Protestantism. He died, probably poisoned, on 5 May 1565.

During the 16th century the German language started to prevail over Romansh. In 1479 about 300 houses and stalls burned in another fire. Nearly a century later, on 23 July 1574, a fire destroyed 174 houses and 114 stalls, or about half the city. Two years later, on 21 October 1576, another 53 houses were burned. Two years after the 1576 fire, the perpetrator, Hauptmann Stör, was executed.

After the Napoleonic Wars the Three Leagues became the Canton of Graubünden in 1803. The guild constitution of the city of Chur lasted until 1839 and in 1874 the Burgergemeinde was replaced by an Einwohnergemeinde. When Graubünden became a canton in 1803, Chur was chosen as its capital.

Chur's Daleu Cemetery is in the centre of town, and in the middle of the cemetery is a 13-tonne (13,000 kg) stone monument that dwarfs the nearby gravestones. The huge monolithic block of granite was erected in 1938 and for decades was largely ignored by passers-by until in 2023 a controversy arose after a Swiss historian discovered that it was originally built as propaganda for the Nazi regime.

== Geography and climate ==
=== Topography ===
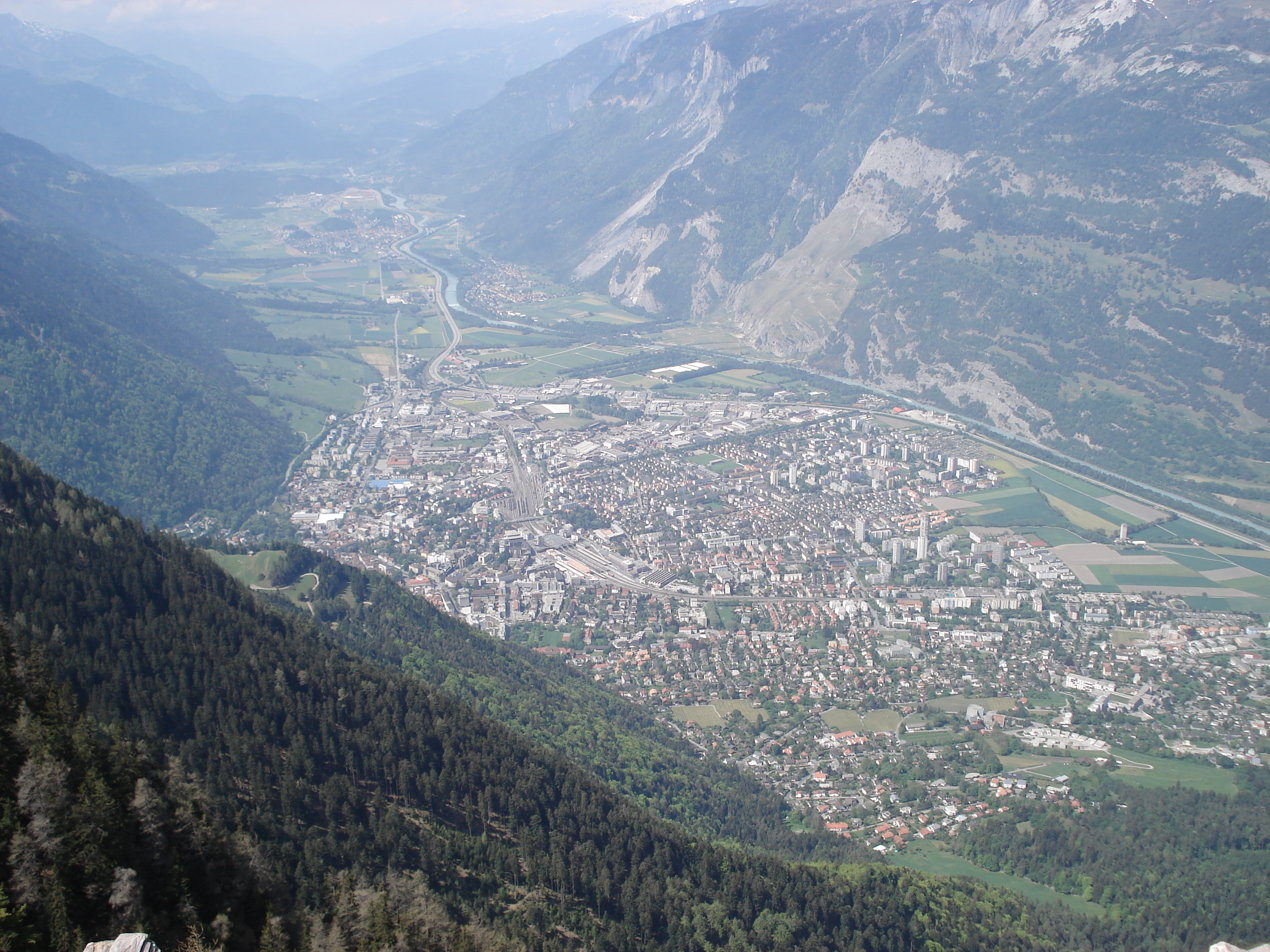
Chur from its highest point, called Fürhörnli, looking upstream

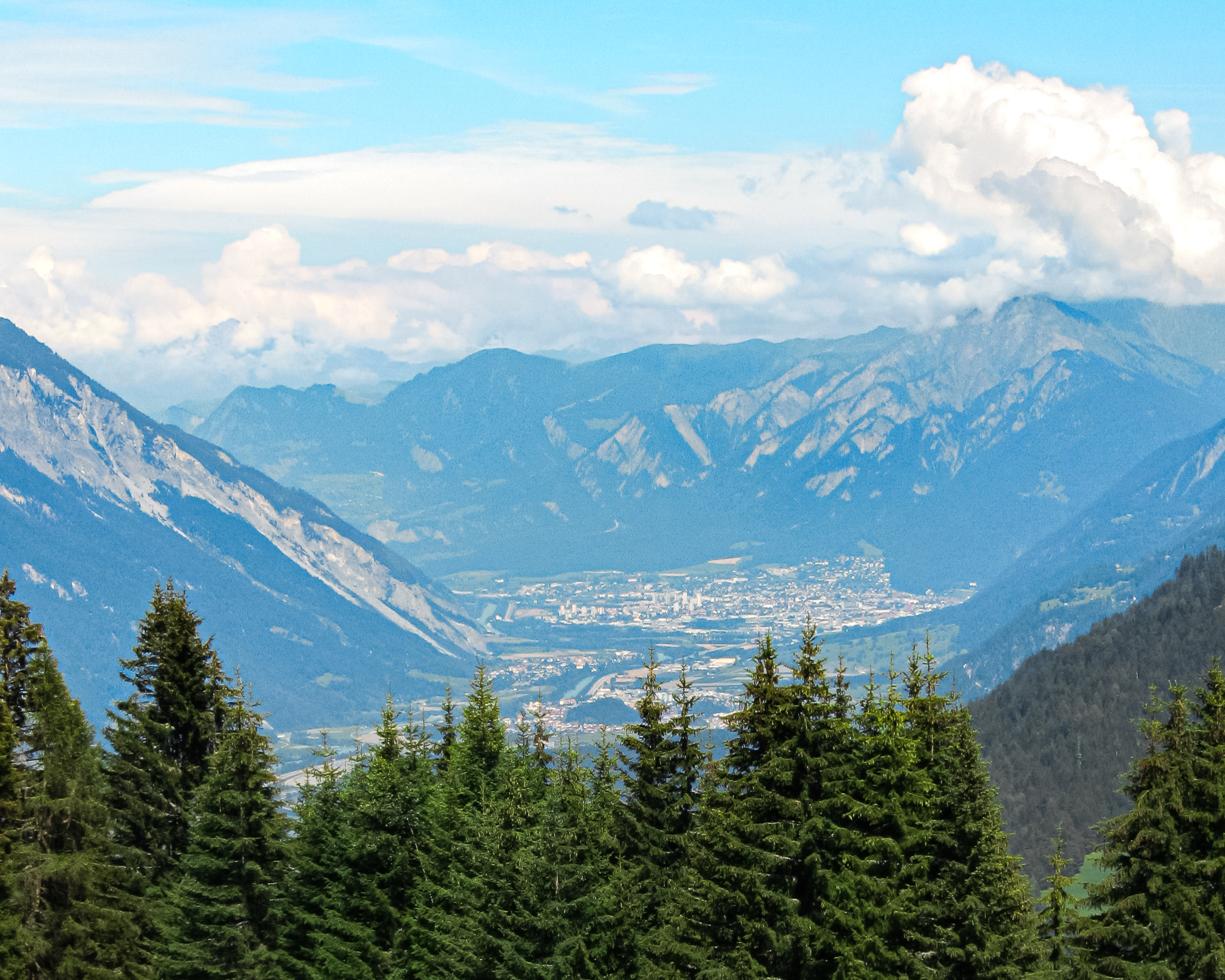
View of Chur from Versam

Chur has an area (as of the 2004/09 survey) of 54.33 km^{2} (20.98 sq mi). About 17.6% is used for agricultural purposes and 52.1% is forested. Of the rest of the land, 26.5% is settled (buildings or roads) and 3.9% is unproductive land. Over the past two decades (1979/85–2004/09) the amount of land that is settled has increased by 86 ha (210 acres) and the agricultural land has decreased by 87 ha (210 acres).

Chur is situated at a height of 594 m (1,949 ft) above sea level, on the right bank of the torrent Plessur just as it issues from the valley Schanfigg and about a mile above its junction with the Rhine, almost entirely surrounded by the Alps, overshadowed by the Mittenberg (northeast) and Pizokel (southwest), hills that guard the entrance to the deep-cut valley Schanfigg.

The altitude in the city area varies from 600 meters (2,000 ft) above sea level to 1,800 meters (5,900 ft) above sea level and the Churer Hausberg Brambrüesch (accessible from the Old Town) is 2,174 meters (7,133 ft) above sea level.

The eastern suburbs of Chur spread up the lower slopes of an enormous, heavily wooded convex landform, one of 16 'alpine megafans' in the Alps. It was probably created by the catastrophic collapse of the mountain crest around the time of deglaciation of the Rhine trough. Another collapse further north along the same crest created the Igis-Zizers megafan. This pair of megafans is global consequential in scale, and as part of the Alpenrhein cluster of 11 anomalously large debris fans they attest to an episode of major landscape dislocation.

=== Climate ===
Chur has an oceanic climate in spite of its inland position. Summers are warm and sometimes hot, normally averaging around 25 °C (77 °F) during the day, whilst winter means are around freezing, with daytime temperatures being about 5 °C (41 °F). Between 1981 and 2010 Chur had an average of 104.6 days of rain per year and on average received 849 mm (33.4 in) of precipitation. The wettest month was August, with an average of 112 mm (4.4 in) of precipitation over an average of 11.2 days. The driest month of the year was February with an average of 47 mm (1.9 in) of precipitation over 6.6 days.

Climate data for Chur, elevation 556 m (1,824 ft), (1991–2020)
Month	Jan	Feb	Mar	Apr	May	Jun	Jul	Aug	Sep	Oct	Nov	Dec	Year
Mean daily maximum °C (°F)	5.2 (41.4)	7.0 (44.6)	11.9 (53.4)	16.1 (61.0)	20.3 (68.5)	23.6 (74.5)	25.3 (77.5)	24.8 (76.6)	20.3 (68.5)	16.1 (61.0)	10.2 (50.4)	5.7 (42.3)	15.5 (59.9)
Daily mean °C (°F)	1.0 (33.8)	2.1 (35.8)	6.3 (43.3)	10.2 (50.4)	14.4 (57.9)	17.7 (63.9)	19.3 (66.7)	18.9 (66.0)	14.9 (58.8)	10.8 (51.4)	5.6 (42.1)	1.9 (35.4)	10.3 (50.5)
Mean daily minimum °C (°F)	−2.1 (28.2)	−1.4 (29.5)	1.9 (35.4)	5.1 (41.2)	9.3 (48.7)	12.6 (54.7)	14.3 (57.7)	14.3 (57.7)	10.6 (51.1)	6.8 (44.2)	2.4 (36.3)	−1.0 (30.2)	6.1 (43.0)
Average precipitation mm (inches)	54.3 (2.14)	40.2 (1.58)	52.9 (2.08)	49.5 (1.95)	70.2 (2.76)	93.3 (3.67)	101.0 (3.98)	119.3 (4.70)	77.4 (3.05)	66.7 (2.63)	68.6 (2.70)	58.4 (2.30)	851.8 (33.54)
Average snowfall cm (inches)	20.0 (7.9)	18.4 (7.2)	6.2 (2.4)	1.1 (0.4)	0.0 (0.0)	0.0 (0.0)	0.0 (0.0)	0.0 (0.0)	0.0 (0.0)	0.6 (0.2)	6.2 (2.4)	16.8 (6.6)	69.3 (27.3)
Average precipitation days (≥ 1.0 mm)	7.8	6.5	7.1	7.1	9.7	11.4	11.3	11.5	8.6	7.7	8.3	8.0	105.0
Average snowy days (≥ 1.0 cm)	4.1	3.2	1.9	0.3	0.0	0.0	0.0	0.0	0.0	0.1	1.2	3.3	14.1
Average relative humidity (%)	74	69	64	61	64	67	68	71	74	74	75	75	70
Mean monthly sunshine hours	97.0	111.7	144.6	158.7	174.1	189.5	207.5	191.8	158.1	131.8	92.7	82.1	1,739.6
Percentage possible sunshine	49	53	54	53	49	52	57	59	58	54	46	45	53
Source 1: NOAA
Source 2: MeteoSwiss

== Politics ==
=== Coat of arms ===
Blazon: Argent, a city gate gules with three merlons, within which a capricorn rampant sable, langued and viriled of the second.

=== Government ===
The City Council (Stadtrat) constitutes the executive government of the City of Chur and operates as a collegiate authority. It is composed of only three councilors (German: Stadtrat/Stadträtin), each presiding over a department. In the mandate period 2021–2024 (Legislatur) the City Council is presided by Stadtpräsident Urs Marti. Departmental tasks, coordination measures and implementation of laws decreed by the Municipal Council (parliament) are carried by the City Council. The regular election of the City Council by any inhabitant valid to vote is held every four years. Any resident of Chur allowed to vote can be elected as a member of the City Council. The current mandate period is from 1 January 2021 to 31 December 2024. The delegates are elected by means of a system of proportional representation. The mayor is elected as such by public election by means of a system of majoritarian representation, while the heads of the other departments are assigned by the collegiate.

As of 2020, Chur's City Council is made up of one representative of the FDP (FDP.The Liberals, who is also the mayor), one of the SP (Social Democratic Party), and one new member of The Centre (former CVP/PDC and BDP/PBD), giving the right parties a new majority of two out of three seats. The last regular election was held on 27 September 2020.

Stadtrat of Chur
City Councillor (Stadtrat/ Stadträtin)	Party	Head of Department (Leitung des Departementes, since) of	elected since
Urs Marti (Note: Mayor (Stadtpräsident).)	FDP	Finanzen Wirtschaft Sicherheit (Finances Economy Security, 2021)	2012
Patrik Degiacomi	SP	Bildung Gesellschaft Kultur (Education Society Culture, 2021)	2016
Sandra Maissen	Centre	Bau Planung Umwelt (Construction Planning Environment, 2021)	2020

=== Parliament ===
The Gemeinderat of Chur for the mandate period of 2021–2024
1. SP (28.6%)
2. FL&G (9.50%)
3. glp (9.50%)
4. Centre (14.3%)
5. FDP (19.0%)
6. SVP (19.0%)

The Municipal Council (Gemeinderat) holds legislative power. It is made up of only 21 members, with elections held every four years. The Municipal Council decrees regulations and by-laws that are executed by the City Council and the administration. The delegates are selected by means of a system of Proporz.

The sessions of the Municipal Council are public. Unlike members of the City Council, members of the Municipal Council are not politicians by profession, and they are paid a fee based on their attendance. Any resident of Chur allowed to vote can be elected as a member of the Municipal Council. The parliament holds its meetings in the Town Hall.

The last regular election of the Municipal Council was held on 27 September 2020 for the mandate period (German: Legislatur) from January 2021 to December 2024. Currently the Municipal Council consist of 6 (-, no change) members of the Social Democratic Party (SP/PS), 4 (-) Swiss People's Party (SVP/UDC), 4 (+1) The Liberals (FDP/PLR), 3 (+1) The Centre (former CVP/PDC and BDP/PBD), 3 (+2) Green Liberal Party (GLP/PVL), 2 (-) Freie Liste & Grüne (Free List & Greens), while the Conservative Democratic Party (BDP/PBD) lost all their 3 seats due to Dissolution and merged with former CVP.

=== Elections ===
==== National Council ====
In the 2015 federal election the most popular party was the SVP/UDC with 26.43% of the vote followed almost equally by the SP/PS (25.96%), then the CVP/PDC (13.74%), the FDP/PLR (12.06%), the BDP/PBD (11.97), and the GLP/PVL (9.71). In the federal election, a total of 11,102 votes were cast, and the voter turnout was 45.4%.

== International relations ==
Chur is twinned with:

- Bad Homburg vor der Höhe, Germany
- Cabourg, France
- Mayrhofen, Austria
- Mondorf-les-Bains, Luxembourg
- Terracina, Italy
- Olathe, United States

== Demographics ==
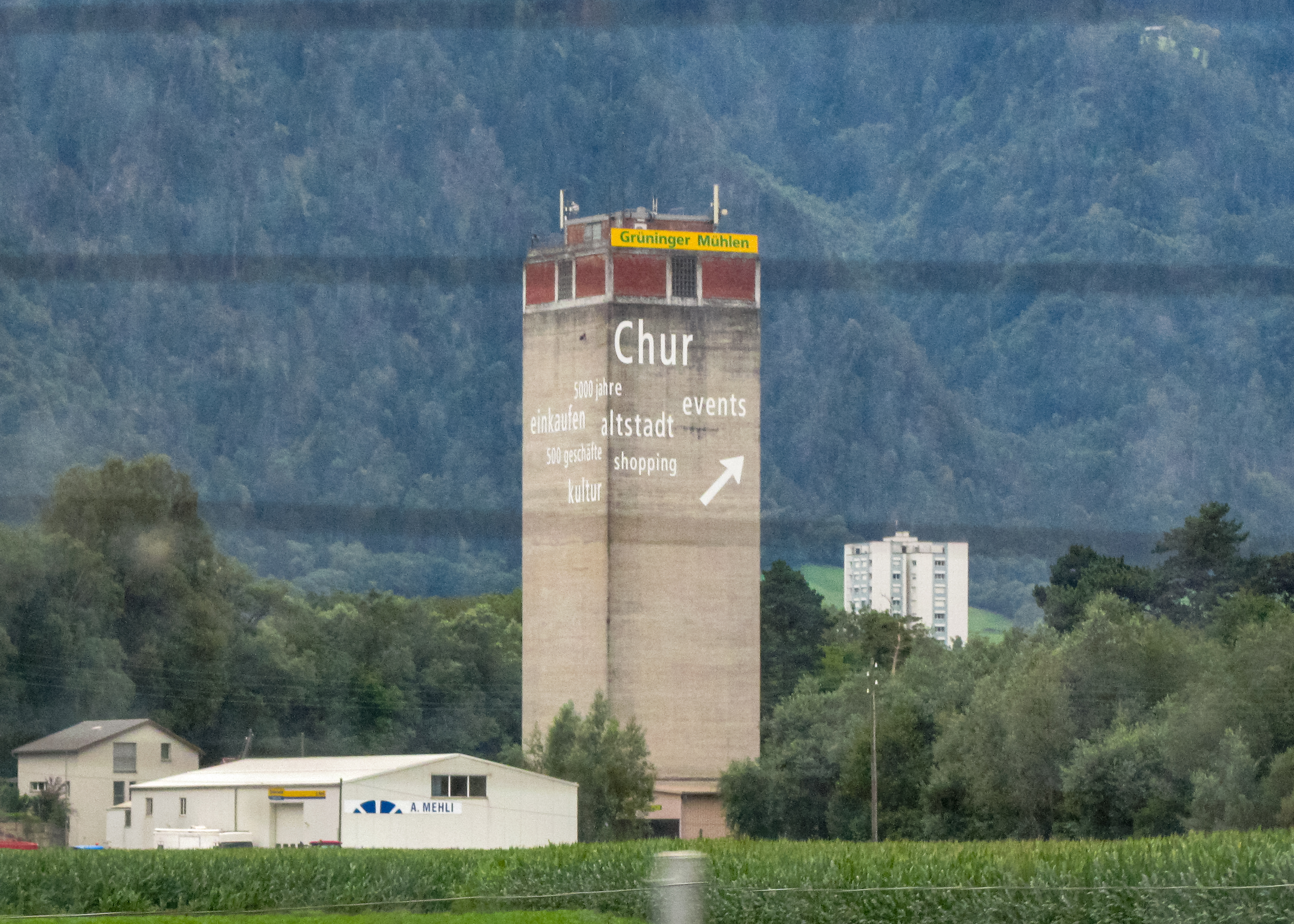
Mühleturm ("Mill Tower") Chur in 2011, before it was repainted as mural

=== Population ===
Chur has a population (as of 31 December 2020) of 36,336. In 2008 17.8% of the population were foreign nationals and by 2014 that number was 19.2%. Over the last 4 years (2010–2014) the population has changed at a rate of 2.34%. The birth rate in the municipality in 2014 was 9.2 and the death rate was 10.0 per thousand residents. Most of the population (as of 2000) speak German (81.0%), with Italian being second most common (6.4%) and Romansh being third (5.3%).

As of 2000 the gender distribution of the population was 47.9% male and 52.1% female. The age distribution as of 2000 in Chur is; 3,087 children or 9.4% of the population are between 0 and 9 years old. 1,602 or 4.9% are 10 to 14 and 2,194 teenagers or 6.7% are 15 to 19. Of the adult population, 4,770 people or 14.5% of the population are between 20 and 29 years old. 5,517 or 16.7% are 30 to 39, 4,616 or 14.0% are 40 to 49 and 4,254 or 12.9% are 50 to 59. 3,090 people or 9.4% of the population are between 60 and 69 years old, 2,314 or 7.0% are 70 to 79, there are 1,307 or 4.0% who are 80 to 89, 233 or 0.7% who are 90 to 99 and 5 who are 100 or more.

In 2015 there were 15,557 single residents, 13,722 people who were married or in a civil partnership, 1,948 widows and widowers, 3,423 divorced residents and 2 people who did not answer the question.

In 2014 there were 16,970 private households in Chur with an average household size of 2.00 persons. Of the 3,792 inhabited buildings in the municipality in 2000, about 37.8% were single-family homes and 39.7% were multiple-family buildings. About 20.5% of the buildings dated from before 1919 and 8.8% were built between 1991 and 2000. In 2013 the rate of construction of new housing units per 1000 residents was 7.71. The vacancy rate for the municipality, in 2015, was 0.6%.

=== Historic population ===
The historical population is given in the following chart:

Historic population data
Year	Population	Swiss	% German speaking	% Italian speaking	% Romansh speaking	% Protestant	% Roman Catholic
13th century	1,000-1,500						
End of the 15th century	ca. 1,500						
1780	2,331						
1860	6,990	6,373				60.8%	39.1%
1880^{a}	8,753	7,866	86.6%	3.2%	11.3%	73.6%	27.8%
1888	9,259	8,094	84.2%	2.7%	12.5%	70.4%	29.5%
1900	11,532	9,687	80.5%	5.9%	12.7%	65.6%	34.4%
1910	14,639	12,042	79.4%	8.0%	11.6%	62.8%	36.8%
1930	15,574	13,685	83.0%	5.3%	10.8%	62.8%	36.7%
1950	19,382	17,852	83.2%	5.2%	10.2%	60.4%	38.5%
1970	31,193	26,332	75.6%	9.7%	10.6%	49.1%	49.6%
1990	32,868	27,259	78.2%	6.2%	6.9%	42.7%	48.5%
2000	32,989	27,061	81.0%	5.1%	5.4%	38.5%	44.6%
2010	36,690	29,695				33.3%	42.0%

^a Language adds up to over 100% due to counting all languages, not just first language.

=== Religion ===
From the 2000 census, 14,713 or 44.6% are Roman Catholic, while 12,199 or 37.0% belonged to the Swiss Reformed Church. Of the rest of the population, there are 15 individuals (or about 0.05% of the population) who belong to the Christian Catholic Church of Switzerland, there are 589 individuals (or about 1.79% of the population) who belong to the Eastern Orthodox Church, and there are 532 individuals (or about 1.61% of the population) who belong to another Christian church. There are 13 individuals (or about 0.04% of the population) who are Jewish, and 917 (or about 2.78% of the population) who are Muslim. There are 424 individuals (or about 1.29% of the population) who belong to another church (not listed on the census), 1,998 (or about 6.06% of the population) belong to no church, are agnostic or atheist, and 1,589 individuals (or about 4.82% of the population) did not answer the question.

=== Education ===
In Chur about 70.3% of the population (between age 25 and 64) have completed either non-mandatory upper secondary education or additional higher education (either University or a Fachhochschule). The town is home to the Cantonal School of Graubünden.

=== Economy ===
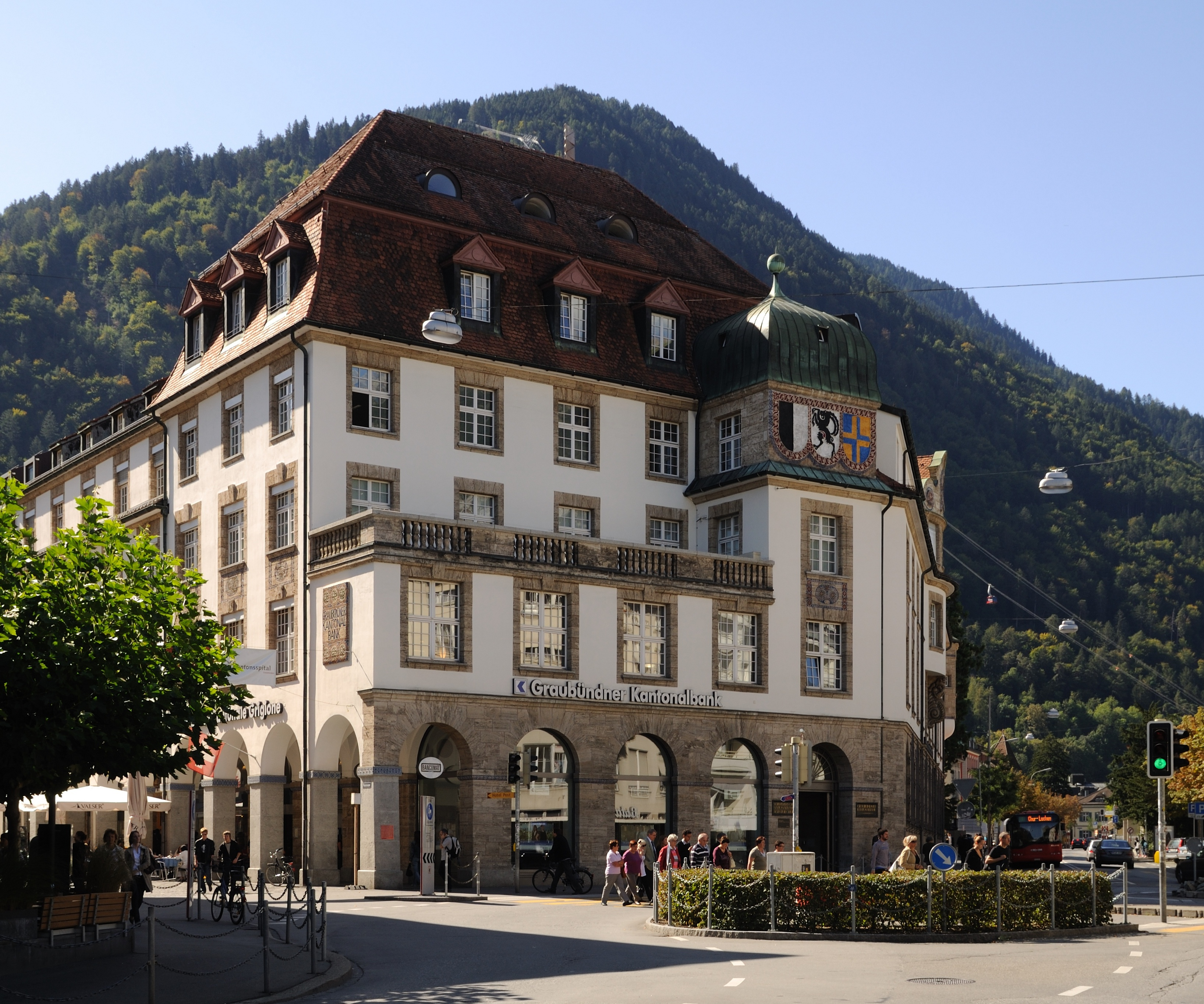
Headquarters of Grisons Cantonal Bank in Postplatz, Chur

As of 2014, there were a total of 32,448 people employed in the municipality. Of these, 108 people worked in 26 businesses in the primary economic sector. A majority (68.5%) of the primary sector employees worked in very small businesses (less than ten employees). The remainder worked in 2 small businesses with a total of 34 employees. The secondary sector employed 3,645 workers in 345 separate businesses. A minority (21.2%) of the secondary sector employees worked in very small businesses. There were 75 small businesses with a total of 1,731 employees and 12 mid sized businesses with a total of 1,141 employees. Finally, the tertiary sector provided 28,695 jobs in 3,375 businesses. In 2014 a total of 16,854 employees worked in 3,306 small companies (less than 50 employees). There were 65 mid-sized businesses with 9,093 employees and 4 large businesses which employed 2,748 people (for an average size of 687).

In 2014 a total of 7.7% of the population received social assistance.

In 2015 local hotels had a total of 152,629 overnight stays, of which 47.8% were international visitors.

There were two cinemas in the municipality in 2015, with a total of 4 screens and 736 seats.

=== Crime ===
In 2014 the crime rate, of the over 200 crimes listed in the Swiss Criminal Code (running from murder, robbery and assault to accepting bribes and election fraud), in Chur was 68.6 per thousand residents, only slightly higher than the national average of 64.6 per thousand. During the same period the rate of drug crimes was 15.7 per thousand residents, which is about one and a half times the national rate. The rate of violations of immigration, visa and work-permit laws was 2.4 per thousand residents, or about half the national rate.

== Transportation ==
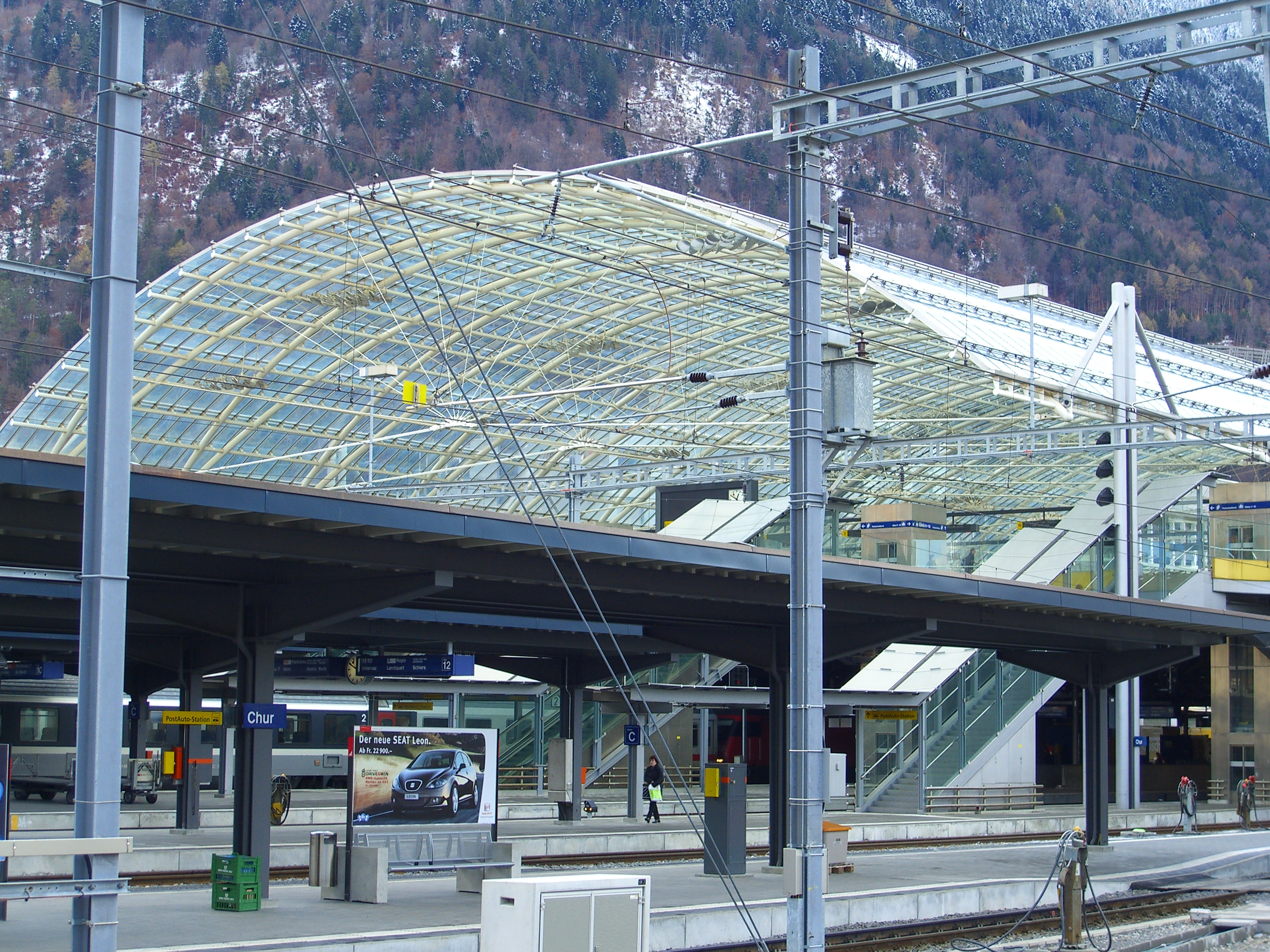
Railway and Post bus station

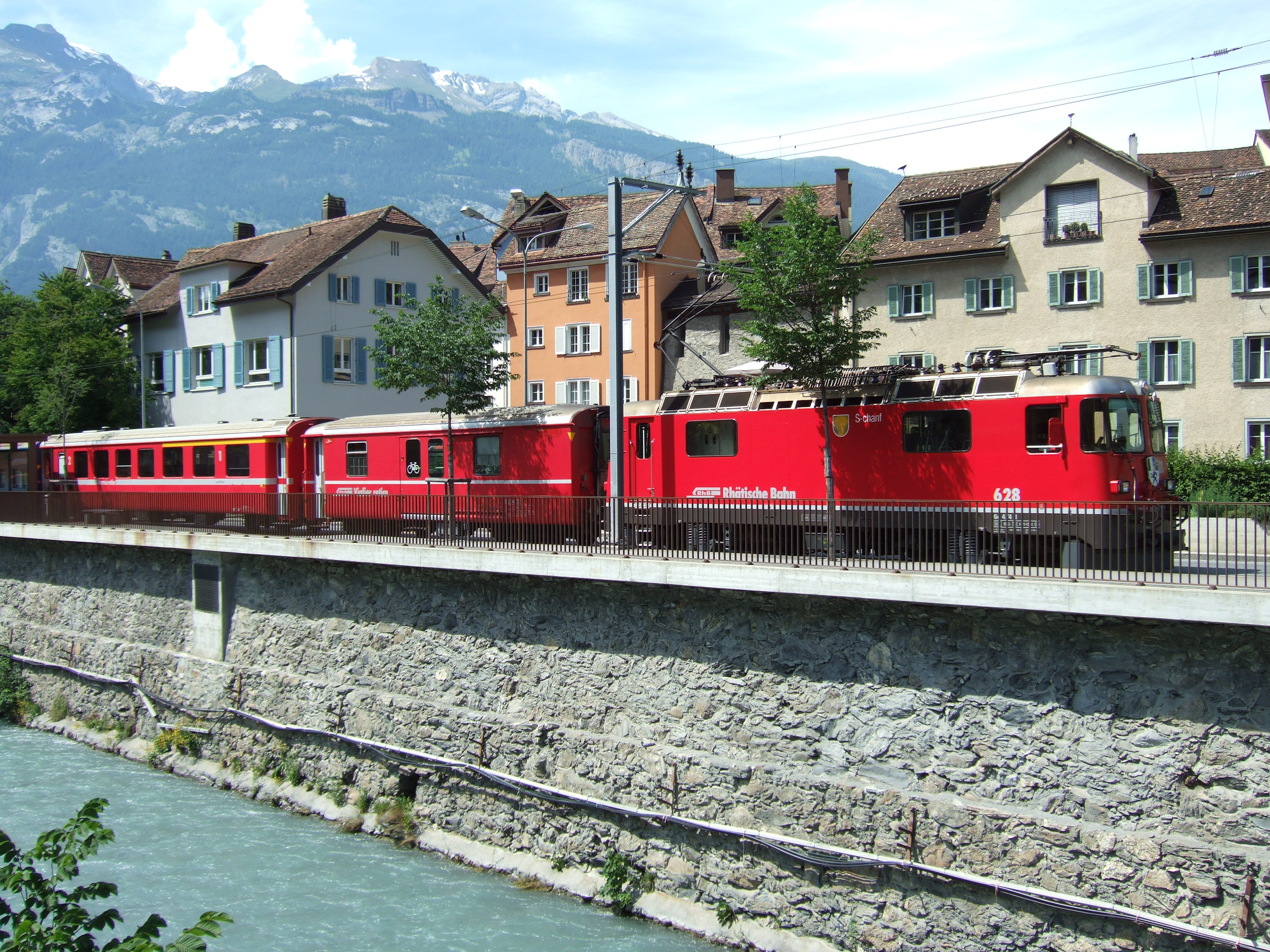
The Arosabahn waits at Chur Stadt

Chur is 120 kilometres (75 miles) by rail from Zürich and is the meeting-point of the routes from Italy over many alpine passes (Lukmanier Pass, Splugen Pass, and San Bernardino Pass), as well as from the Engadin (Albula Pass, Julier Pass), so that it is the centre of an active trade (particularly in wine from the Valtelline), though it also has a few local factories.

The city's main railway station is where the Swiss Federal Railways system link with that of the Rhaetian Railway (RhB). While the SBB lines serve most of Switzerland, most of Graubünden's internal rail traffic is served by RhB lines. One of the RhB lines (to Arosa) uses on-street running through streets in the centre of Chur and Sand in order to reach Chur Altstadt railway station. Other stations are Chur West, Chur Wiesental, and Haldenstein.

There is also a postbus station situated above the railway station.

The nearest airport is Zurich Airport, located 130 km (81 mi) north west of Chur.

Chur is linked by a motorway—the A13.

== Culture and tourism ==
=== Main sights ===
Chur is home to many buildings or other sites that are listed as Swiss heritage sites of national significance. There are two archeological sites in Chur, the old city, which is a medieval city, and Welschdörfli, a prehistoric settlement and Roman Vicus. There are four archives or libraries; the bishop's palace (library and archive), the Cantonal Library, the Cantonal Archive of Graubünden and the city archive of Chur. There are also four museums on the list; the Bündner Kunstmuseum (Art Museum), Bündner Naturmuseum (Natural History Museum), the Dommuseum and the Rätisches Museum in the Haus Buol. Three churches are included in the list; The cathedral of the Assumption, the Catholic Church of St. Luzi and the Reformed Church of St. Martin. There are 15 other buildings that are also heritage sites; these include the Alte Kaserne at Zeughaus 3 (the Old Armory), the Confederation Paper Mill, the Main Post Office, the new Town Hall, headquarters of the Rhätische Bahn and several old patrician houses. With the 2021 merger of Haldenstein into Chur, the Ruins of Haldenstein fortress and Haldenstein Castle became part of Chur.

=== Media ===
The Romansh-speaking Radiotelevisiun Svizra Rumantscha (RTR), part of the Swiss Broadcasting Corporation, has its headquarters in Chur. Two local newspapers are published in Chur: Die Südostschweiz (in German) and La Quotidiana (in Romansh).

== Gallery ==
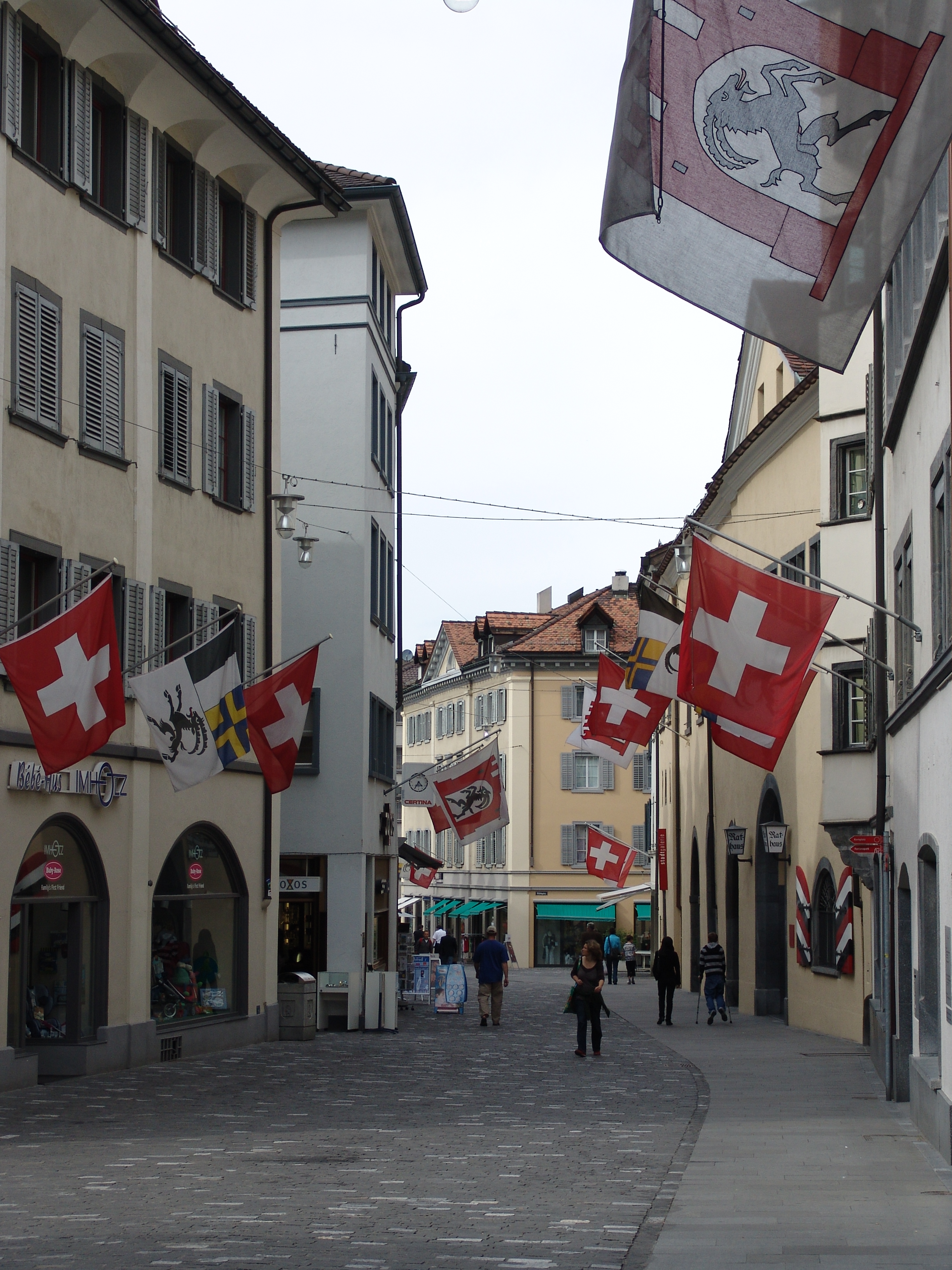
Poststrasse, Old Town

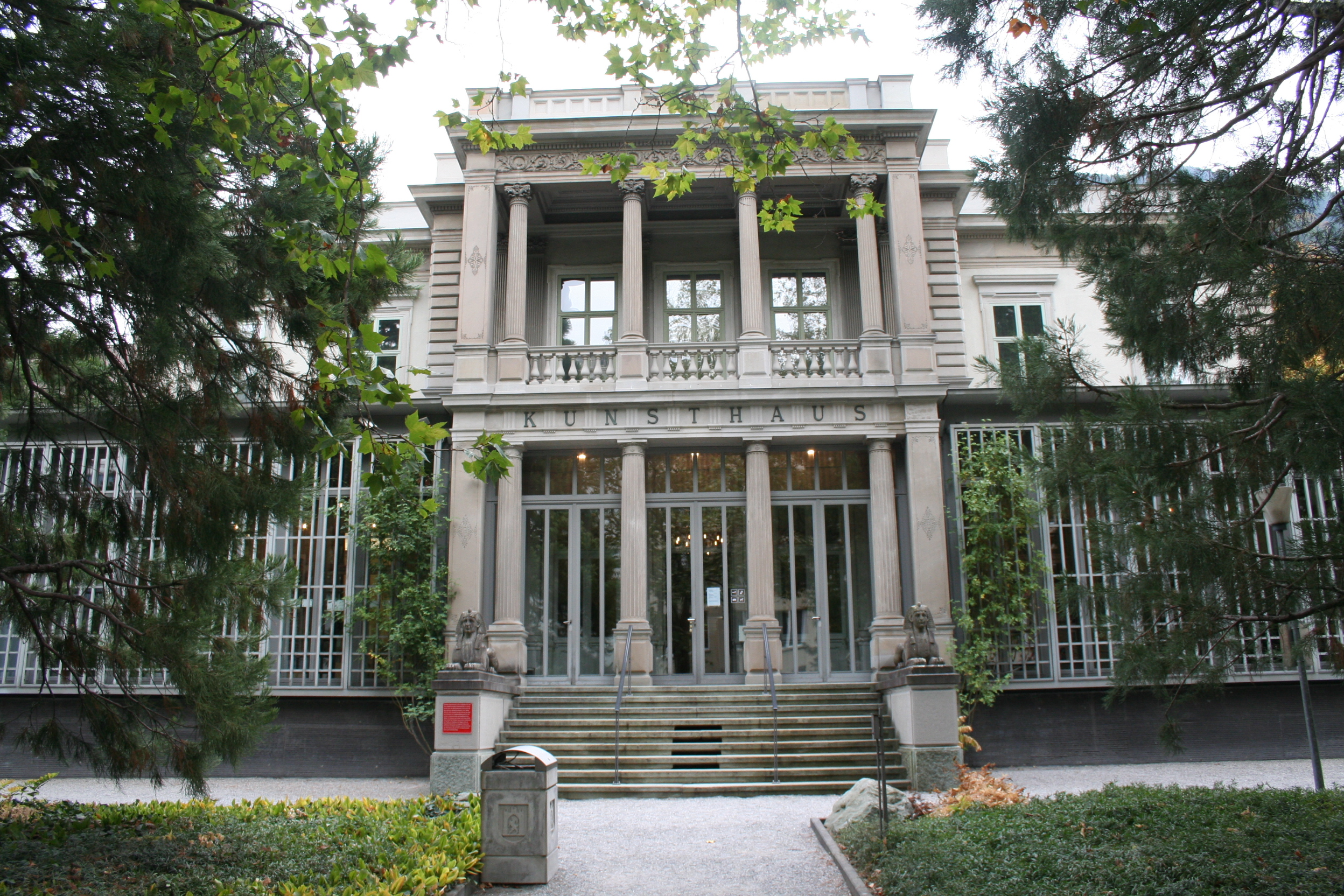
Bündner Kunstmuseum (Grisonian Art Museum)

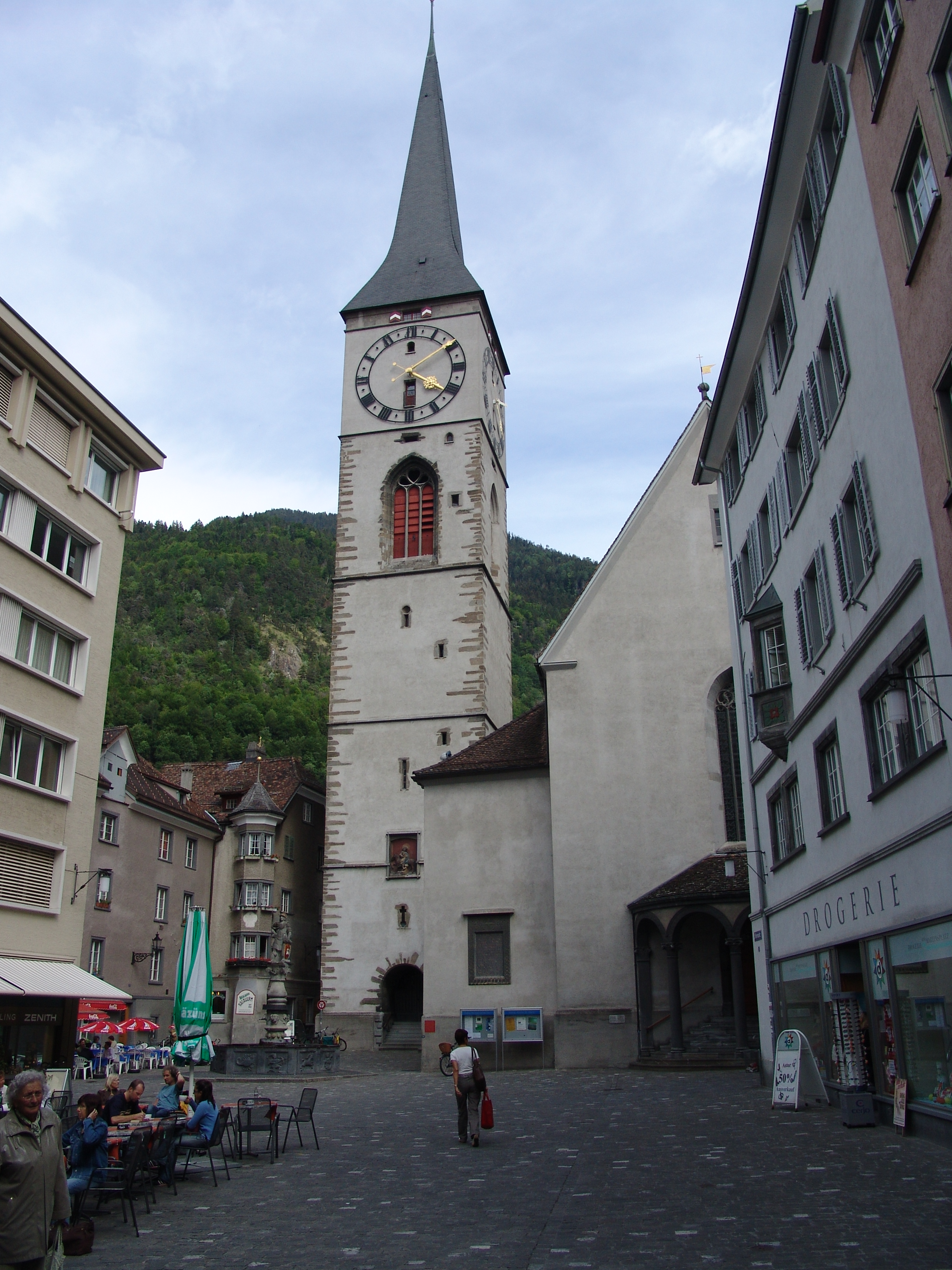
Church of St. Martin

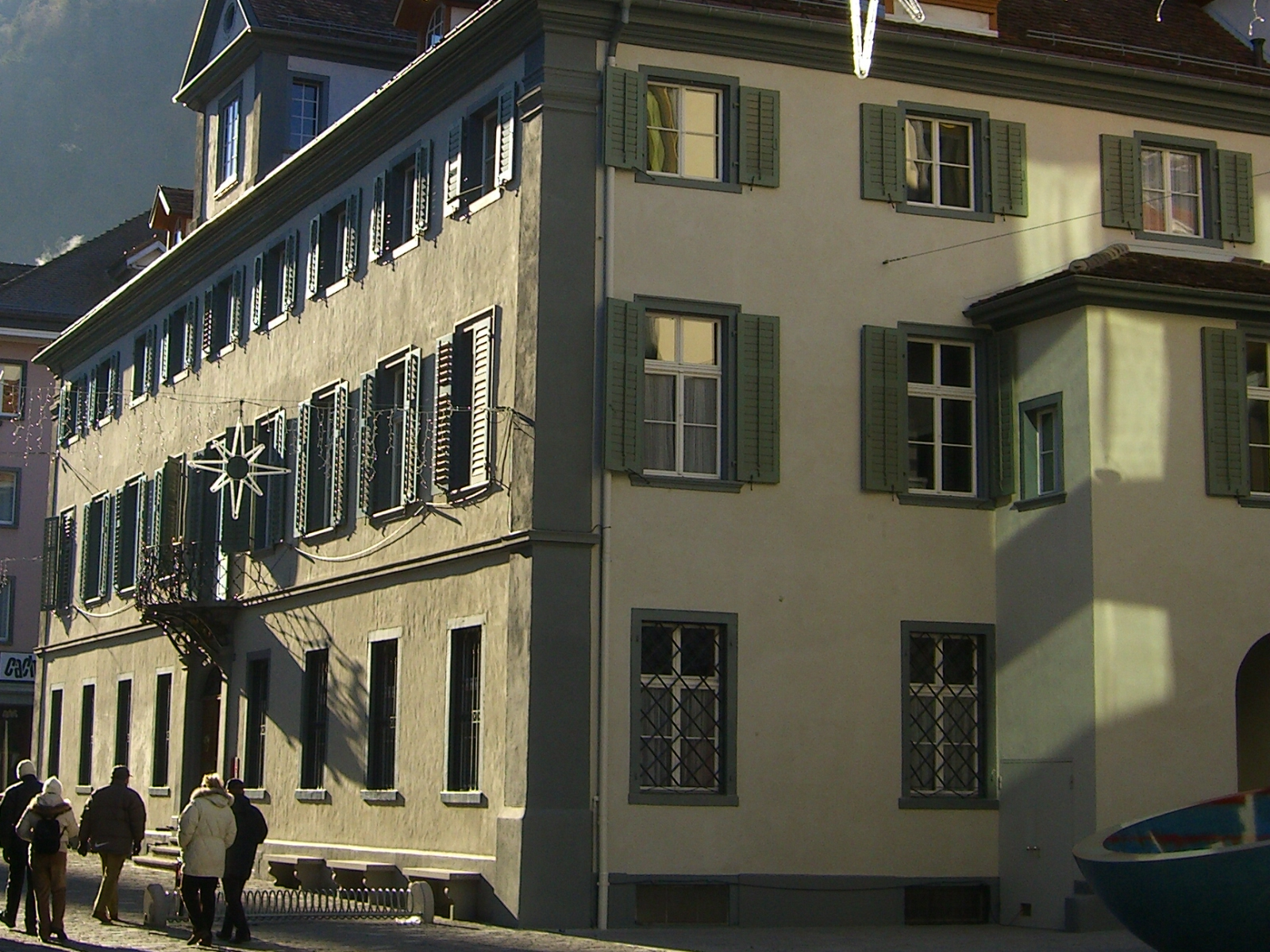
Kantonsgerichtsgebäude (home of cantonal court)

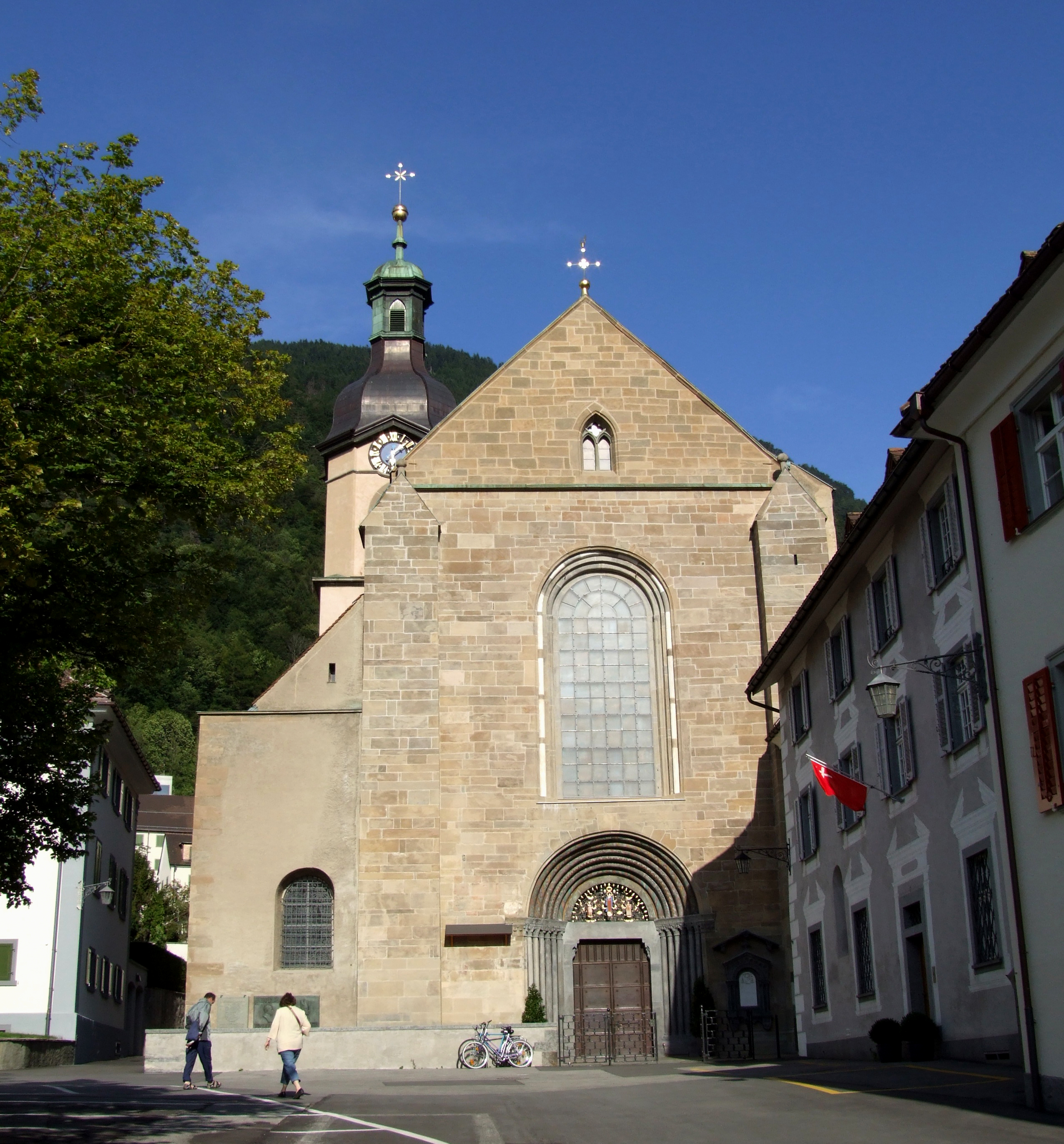
St. Maria Himmelfahrt (cathedral of the Assumption)

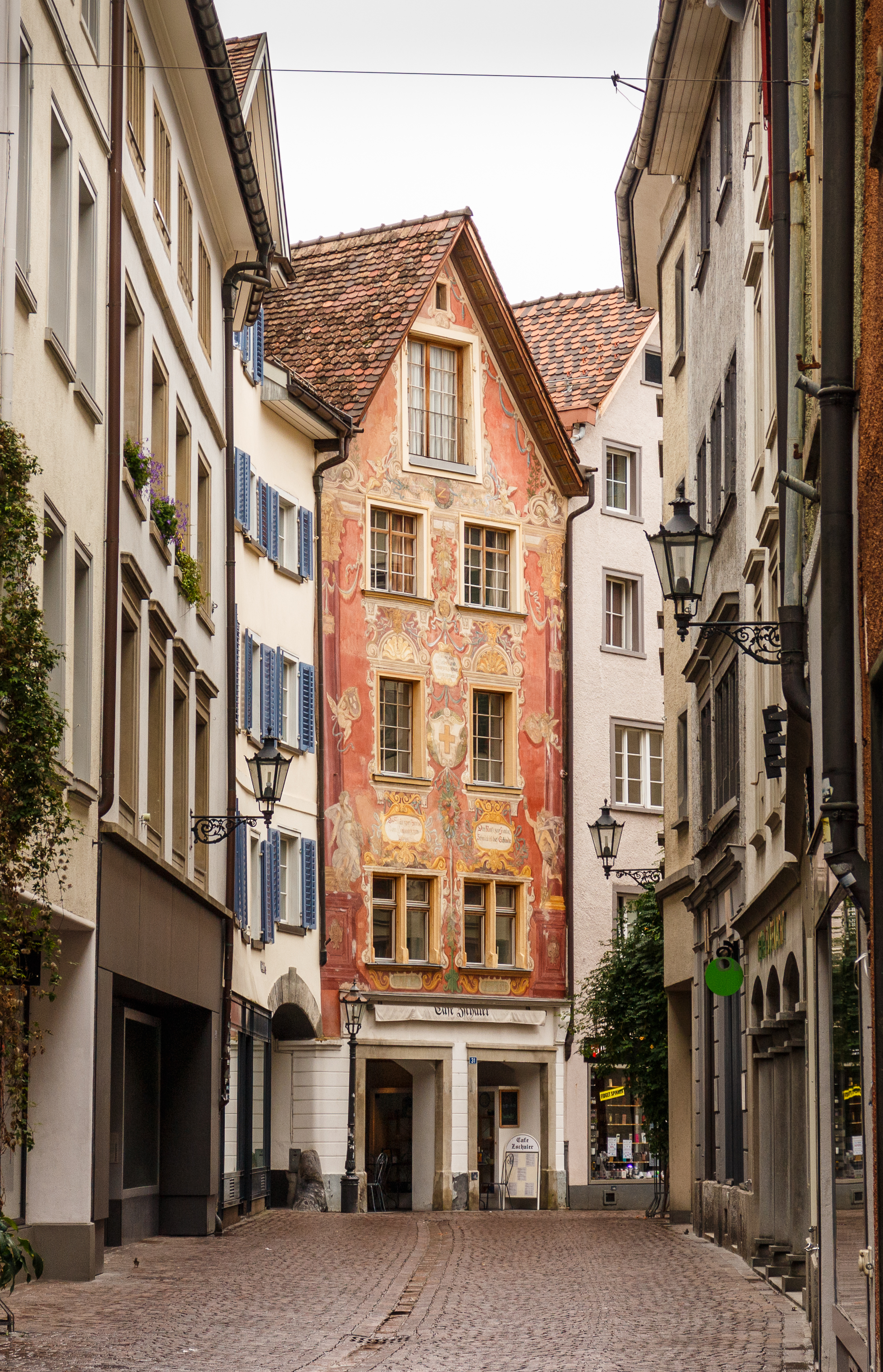
Street in Altstadt

The first church on the cathedral site was built in the first half of the 5th century. The Romanesque crypt was probably built under Bishop Tello (758–773). It contains remarkable paintings by Albrecht Dürer and Hans Holbein. The current building was built between 1154 and 1270. In 1272 it was dedicated to Saint Mary of the Assumption. The round arch window along the center axis is the largest medieval window in Graubünden. The late-Gothic high altar was completed in 1492 by Jakob Russ.

The Church of St. Luzi was probably built in the 8th century, though the first record of it appears in 821 when the relics of St. Luzius were removed from the church. It may have been the site of a Carolingian scribes' school during the early Middle Ages. In 1149 it became the church of the Premonstratensian monastery.

The town is home to the Giger Bar designed by the Swiss artist H. R. Giger, the Old Town, the art gallery, and the natural history museum.

== Sport ==
Chur is a hockeytown and its team, EHC Chur, currently plays in the Swiss League, the second tier of the Swiss ice hockey league system. They play their home games in the 6,500-seat Hallenstadion.

The American football team Calanda Broncos (formally the Landquart Broncos) moved to Chur in 2009, playing their home games at Ringstrasse Stadium. The Broncos currently play in the Nationalliga A and are the most successful Swiss American football team with the record for most Swiss Bowl wins (eight wins) as well as winning the EFAF Cup in 2010 and the Eurobowl in 2012. As of 2017 they finished first in the league, hosting Swiss Bowl XXXII in Ringstrasse Stadium where they defeated the Basel Gladiators 42–6 on 8 July.

The local football team are FC Chur 97 who play in the sixth division of Swiss football. They play home games at Ringstrasse.

== List of notable people ==
=== Early times ===
- George Blaurock (c. 1492 – 1529), Grisonian Catholic pater and leading personality of the Radical Reformation, one of the founders of Anabaptism
- Johannes Fabricius Montanus (1527–1577), German theologian and poet
- Jörg Jenatsch (1596–1639), Grisonian politician during the Thirty Years' War, assassinated in Chur.
- Soloman Sprecher von Bernegg (1697–1758), Habsburg field marshal in the Seven Years' War

=== 18th century ===
- Jerome, 2nd Count de Salis (1709–1794), a Fellow of the Royal Society and sometime British Resident in the Grisons.
- Jeremiah Theus (1716–1746), Swiss-American painter, primarily of portraits.
- Angelica Kauffman, RA (1741–1801), Austrian Neoclassical painter, successful career in London and Rome.
- Richard La Nicca (1794–1883 in Chur), a Swiss engineer, planned and implemented the Jura water correction project in the Swiss Jura

=== 19th century ===
- Alexander Moritzi (1806–1850), a Swiss naturalist and early proponent of evolution
- Gottfried Ludwig Theobald (1810–1869 in Chur), a German-Swiss geologist and cartographer, taught in Chur 1854–1869.
- Johann Baptista von Tscharner (1815–1879), born and died in Chur, lawyer and politician
- Philip Schaff (1819–1893), Protestant theologian and church historian, lived and taught in the United States
- Johann Coaz (1822–1918), a forester, topographer and mountaineer from Graubünden
- Simeon Bavier (1825–1896), a politician, member of the Swiss Federal Council 1878–1883
- Eduard Killias (1829–1891), a Swiss physician, naturalist and balneologist
- Carl Hilty (1833–1909), a philosopher, writer and worked as a lawyer in Chur for 20 years
- Adolfo Kind (1848–1907), a chemical engineer and one of the fathers of skiing in Italy
- Clara Ragaz (1874–1957), feminist, pacifist and supporter of the temperance movement
- Jakob Buchli (1876–1945), engineer in the field of locomotive design
- Alfred Heuß (1877–1934), German musicologist
- Josias Braun-Blanquet (1884–1980), a phytosociologist and botanist
- Rosa Gutknecht (1885–1959), a German-born Swiss theologian and cleric, in 1918 she was one of the first two women to graduate in theology and be ordained as pastors
- Harry Clarke (1889–1931 in Chur), an Irish stained-glass artist and book illustrator
- Kurt Huber (1893–1943), a university professor and resistance fighter with the anti-Nazi group White Rose
- Maurice Conradi (1896–1947 in Chur), a Russian White officer who fought in World War I and the Civil War in Russia

=== 20th century ===
- Robert Platow (1900–1982 in Chur), German journalist, founder and publisher of the Platow Brief
- Heinrich Willi (1900–1971), pediatrician who co-discovered Prader–Willi syndrome
- Andreas Walser (1908–1930), a Swiss painter in Paris
- Gustav Guanella (1909–1982), a Swiss inventor, developed high-frequency electronics
- Meinrad Schütter (1910–2006), a Swiss composer
- Rudolf Olgiati (1910–1995), local architect, of the New Objectivity movement
- H. R. Giger (1940–2014), visual artist, painter and Oscar winner
- Peter Zumthor (born 1943), an uncompromising and minimalist Swiss architect, works in Chur
- Alex P. Schmid (born 1943), a Swiss-born Dutch scholar in terrorism studies and former Officer-in-Charge of the Terrorism Prevention Branch of the United Nations
- Mario Illien (born 1946), engineer, specialising in motorsport engine design
- Robert Indermaur (born 1947), a Swiss painter and sculptor
- Rut Plouda (born 1948), a Swiss poet and novelist
- Hans Danuser (born 1953), a Swiss artist and photographer
- Corin Curschellas (born 1956), a Swiss singer-songwriter, vocalist, free improvisation, actress and voice actress
- Valerio Olgiati (born 1958), renowned architect of Grisonian buildings
- Raphael Zuber (born 1973), renowned architect
- Adrian J. Meier (born 1976), politician of local council and explorer
- Rebecca Indermaur (born c. 1977), a Swiss film and television actress

=== Sport ===
- Rico Bianchi (born 1930), a Swiss rower, competed in the 1952 and 1960 Summer Olympics
- Yvonne Rüegg (born 1938), a Swiss former alpine skier, gold medallist in giant slalom at the 1960 Winter Olympics
- Renato Tosio (born 1964), former ice hockey goaltender of EHC Chur
- Mario Frick (born 1974), a Swiss-born Liechtensteiner retired professional footballer was the manager for FC Vaduz between 2018 and 2021; 664 team games and 125 for his national team
- Giorgio Rocca (born 1975), an Italian former alpine skier
- Thierry Paterlini (born 1975), a Swiss professional ice hockey defenceman
- Binia Feltscher (born 1978), Swiss curler, silver medallist at the 2006 Winter Olympics
- Nino Schurter (born 1986), mountain biker and Olympic gold medallist, lives in Chur
- Nino Niederreiter (born 1992), second highest NHL-drafted Swiss-born hockey player
- Livia Peng (born 2002), football goalkeeper for the Switzerland national team
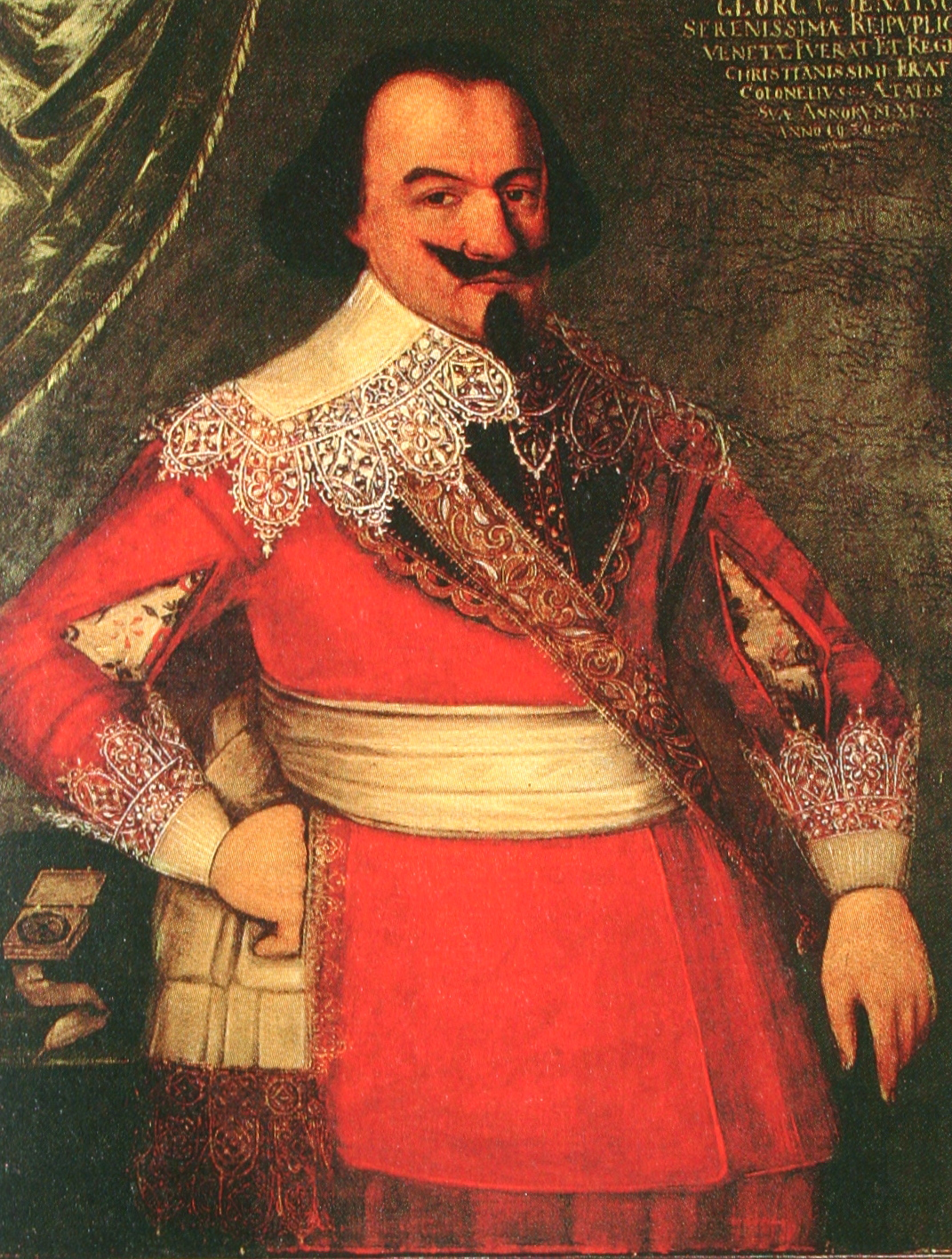
Georg Jenatsch, 1636

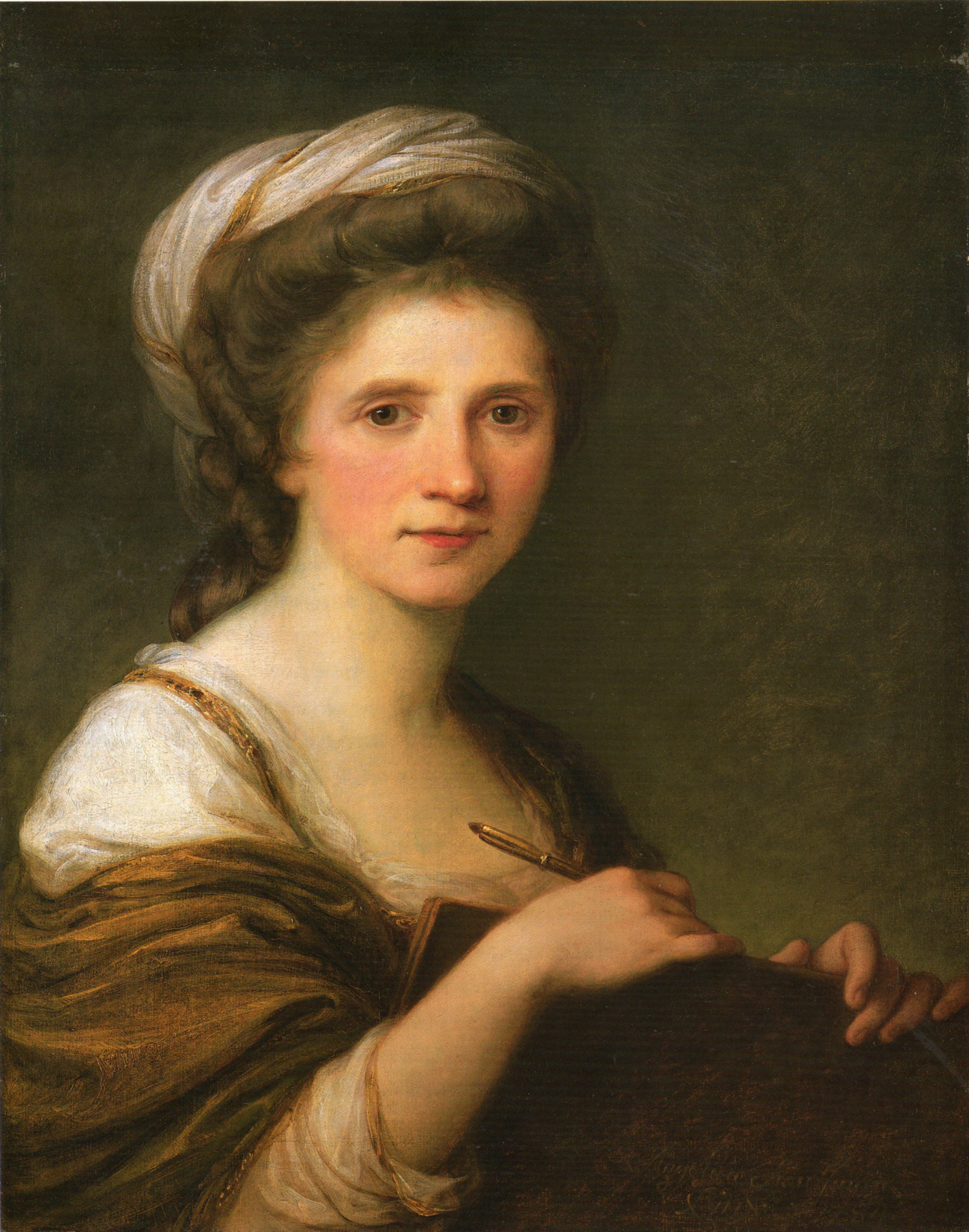
Angelika Kauffmann, self portrait, 1784

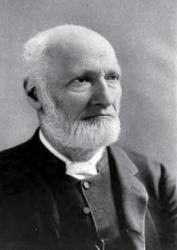
Philip Schaff

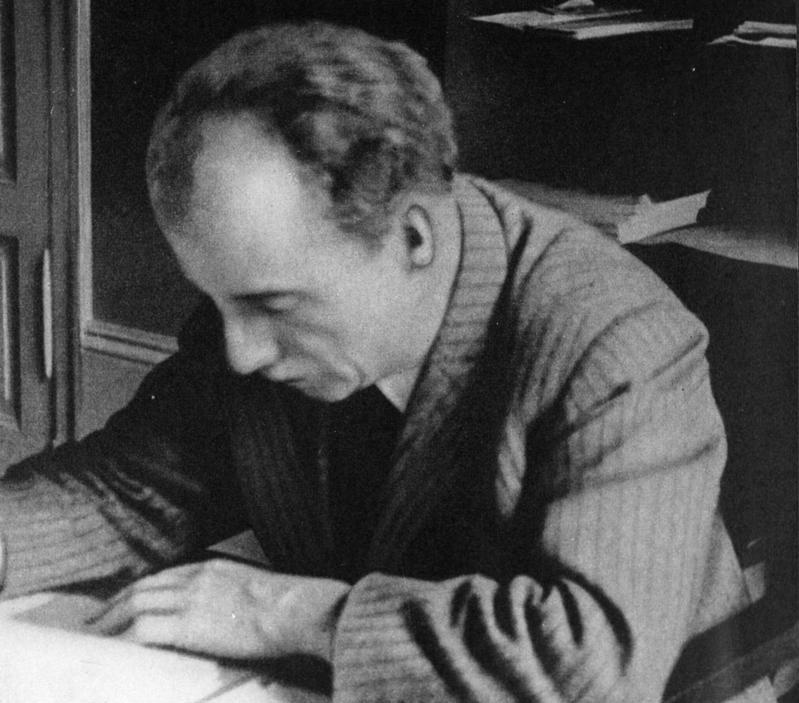
Kurt Huber

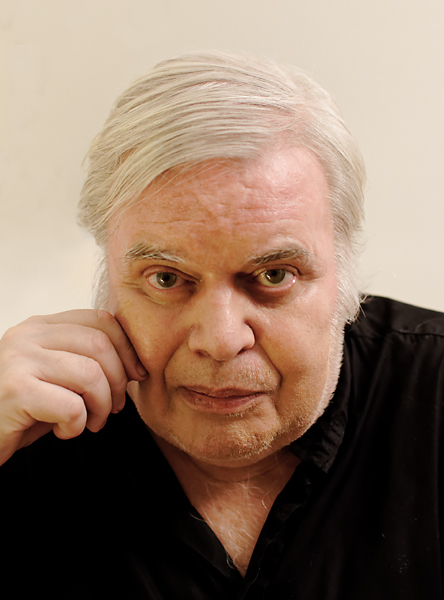
H. R. Giger, 2012

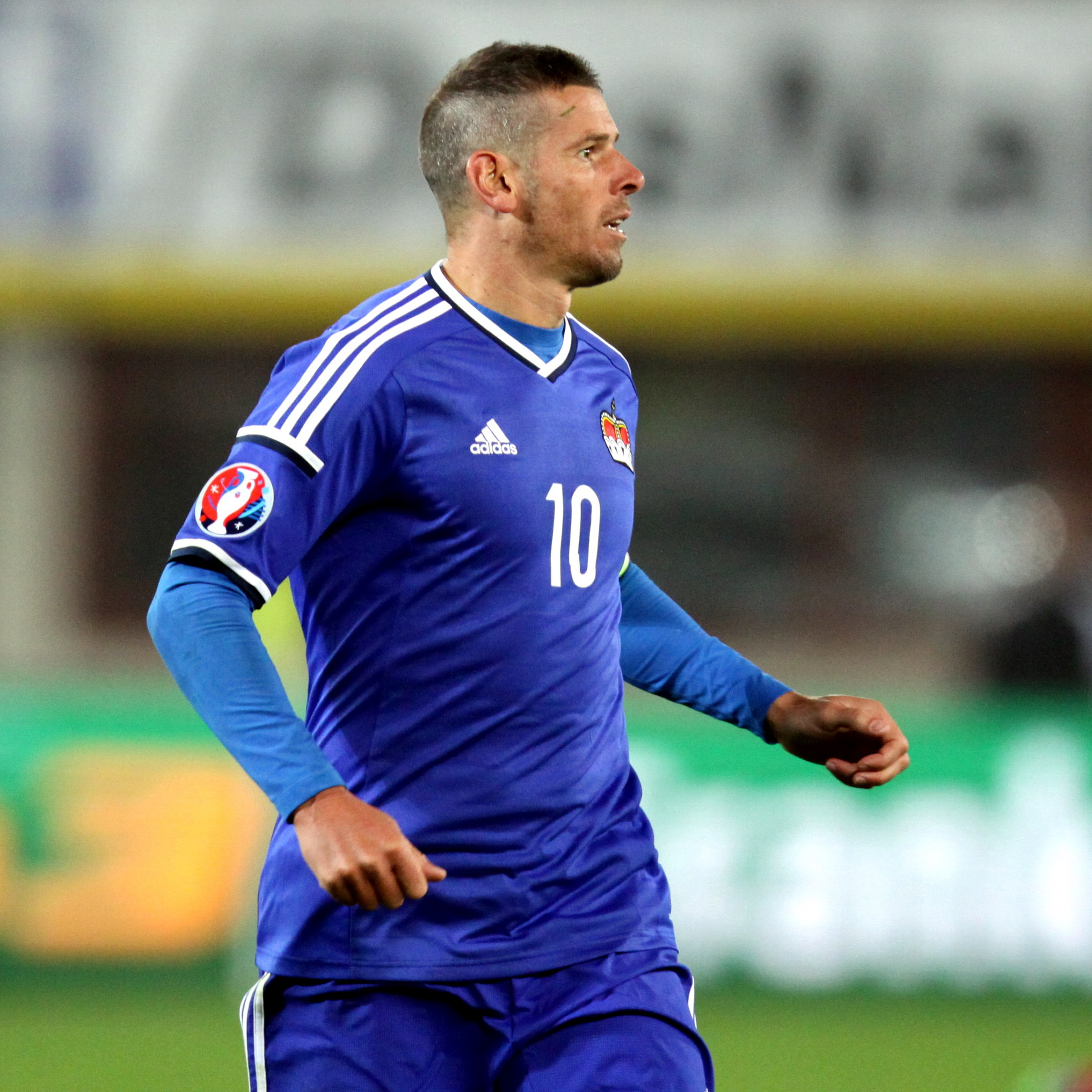
Mario Frick, 2015

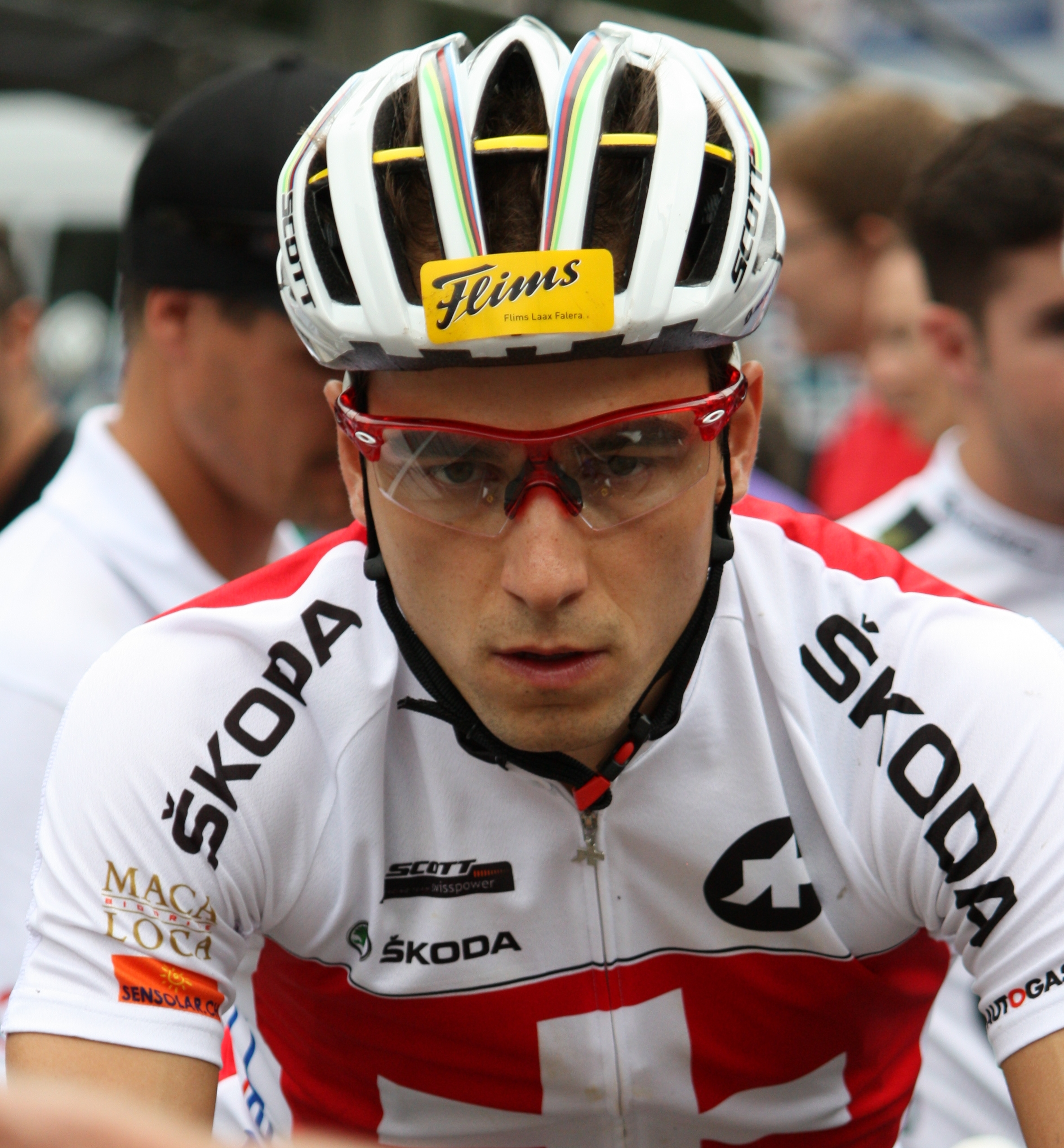
Nino Schurter, 2011

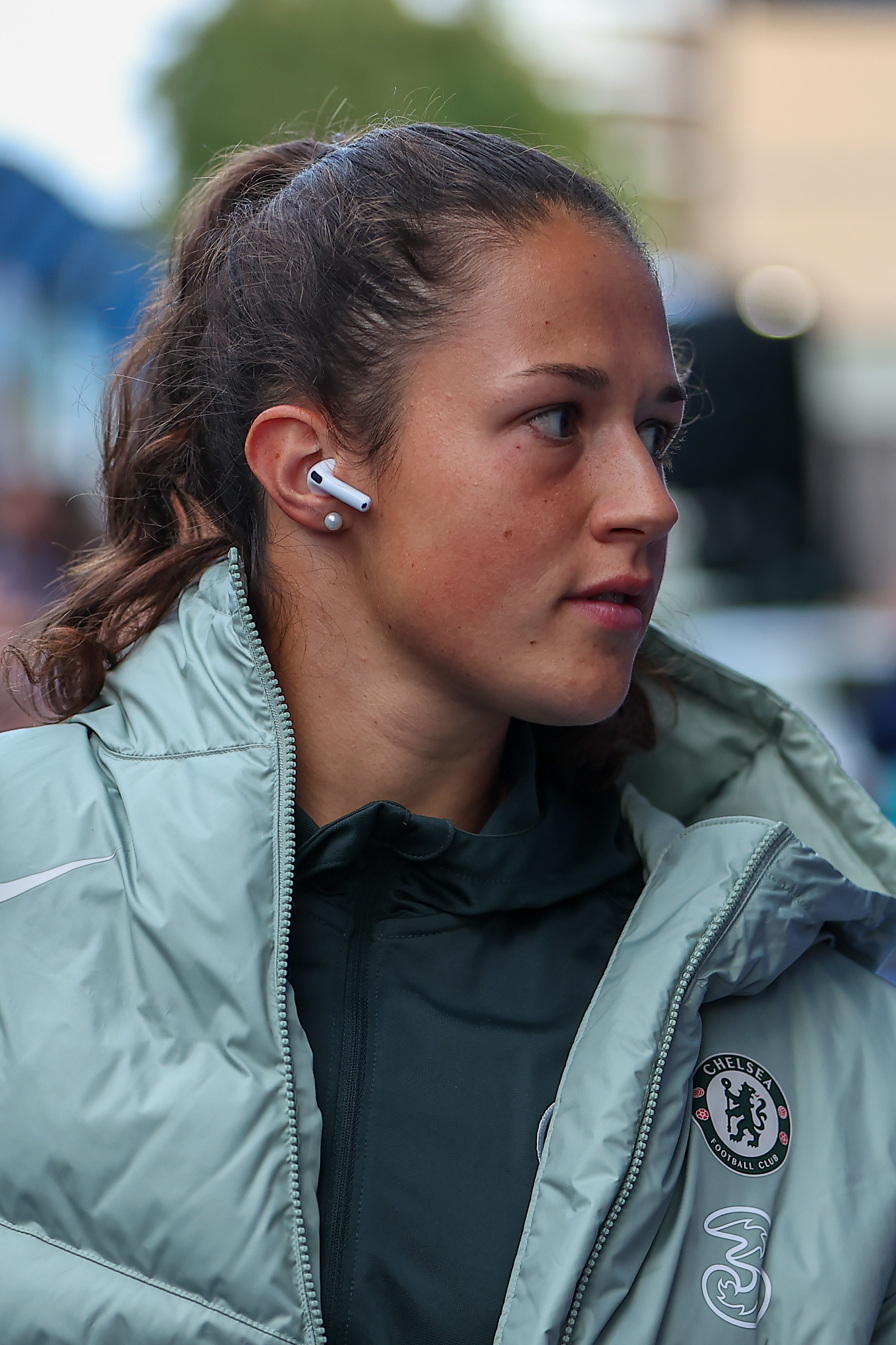
Livia Peng, 2025

== Notes and references ==
=== Literature ===
- "Chur (municipality)" in Romansh, German, French and Italian in the online Historical Dictionary of Switzerland, 18 November 2015.
- A. Eichhorn, Episcopatus Curiensis (St Blasien, 1797)
- W. von Juvalt, Forschungen fiber die Feudalzeit im Curischen Raetien, two parts (Zürich, 1871)
- C. Kind, Die Reformation in den Bistumern Chur und Como (Coire, 1858)
- Conradin von Moor, Geschichte von Curraetien (2 vols., Coire, 1870–1874)
- P. C. you Planta, Des alte Raetien (Berlin, 1872); Idem, Die Curraetischen Herrschaften in der Feudalzeit (Bern, 188i); Idem, Verfassungsgeschichte der Stadt Cur im Mittelalter (Coire, 1879); Idem, Geschichte von Graubünden (Bern, 1892).
- Coolidge, William Augustus Brevoort (1911). "Coire" . In Chisholm, Hugh (ed.). Encyclopædia Britannica. Vol. 6 (11th ed.). Cambridge University Press. p. 654.
- Principality of Liechtenstein homepage on religion
