= List of mayors of Chur =

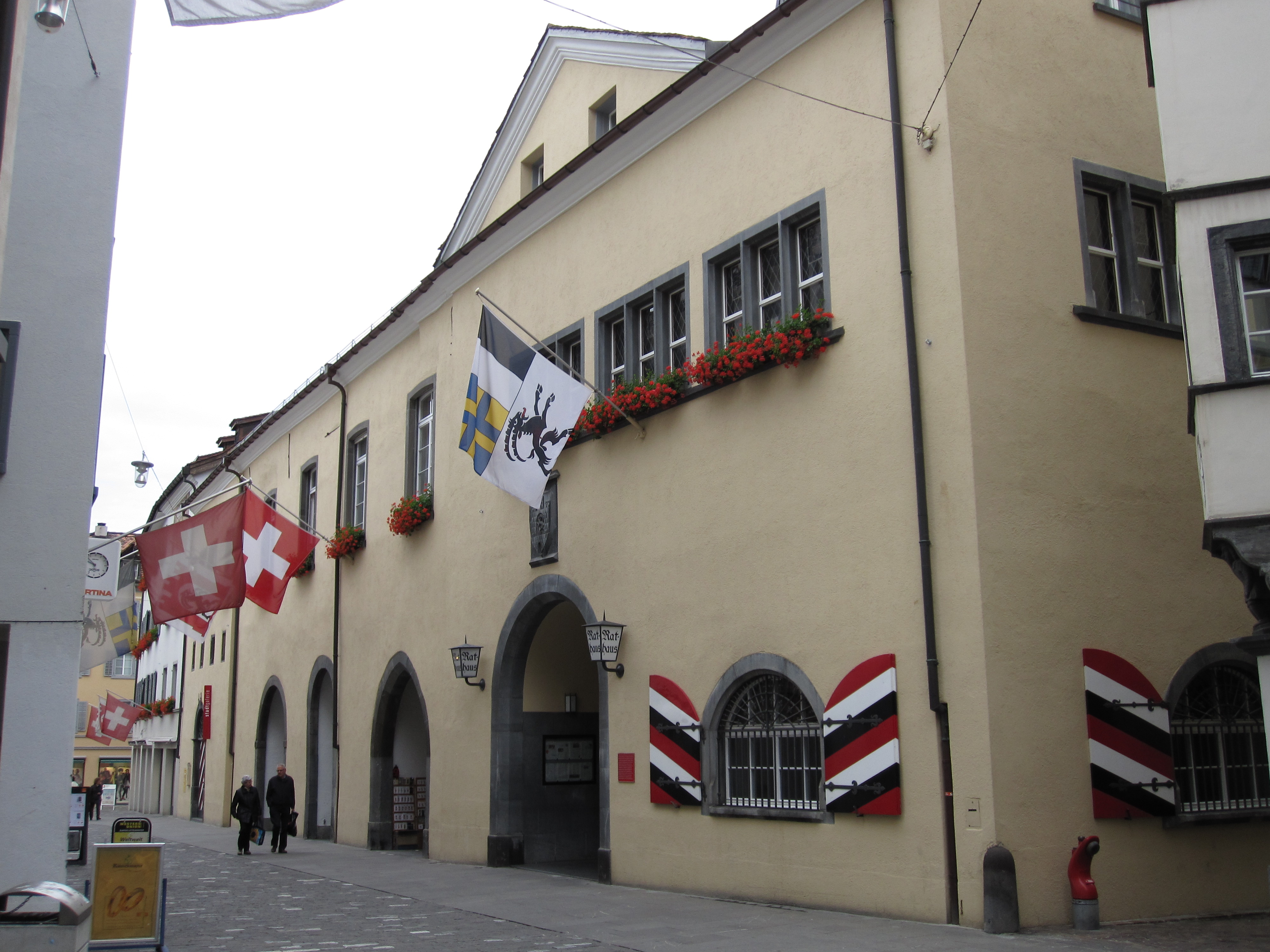
Rathaus Chur

Coat of arms of Chur

This is a list of mayors of Chur. The mayor of Chur held the title of Bürgermeister until 1875. Since then, the Stadtpräsident presides the city's executive, the office of the Bürgermeister is limited to the presidency of the local citizen's corporation (Bürgergemeinde).

Mayor (Stadtpräsident) of Chur
Term	Mayor	Lifespan	Party	Notes
1895–1904	Richard Camenisch	(1837–1904)		
1904–1911	Georg Oreste Olgiati	(1869–1920)		
1911–1915	Robert Pedotti	(1868–1915)		
1915–1926	Georg Hartmann	(1873–1932)		
1926–1935	Adolf Nadig	(1877–1960)		
1936–1951	Johann Rudolf (Gian) Mohr	(1885–1956)	FDP	
1951–1960	Johann Anton Caflisch			
1960–1972	Georg Sprecher			
1973–1988	Andrea Melchior		LdU	
1988?–1996	Rolf Stiffler		FDP	
1996–2000	Christian Aliesch		SVP	
2001–2012	Christian Boner		BDP	
2013–2024	Urs Marti	(born 1967)	FDP	
2024–present	Hans Martin Meuli		FDP	
