= Gottfried Ludwig Theobald =

German-Swiss geologist and cartographer

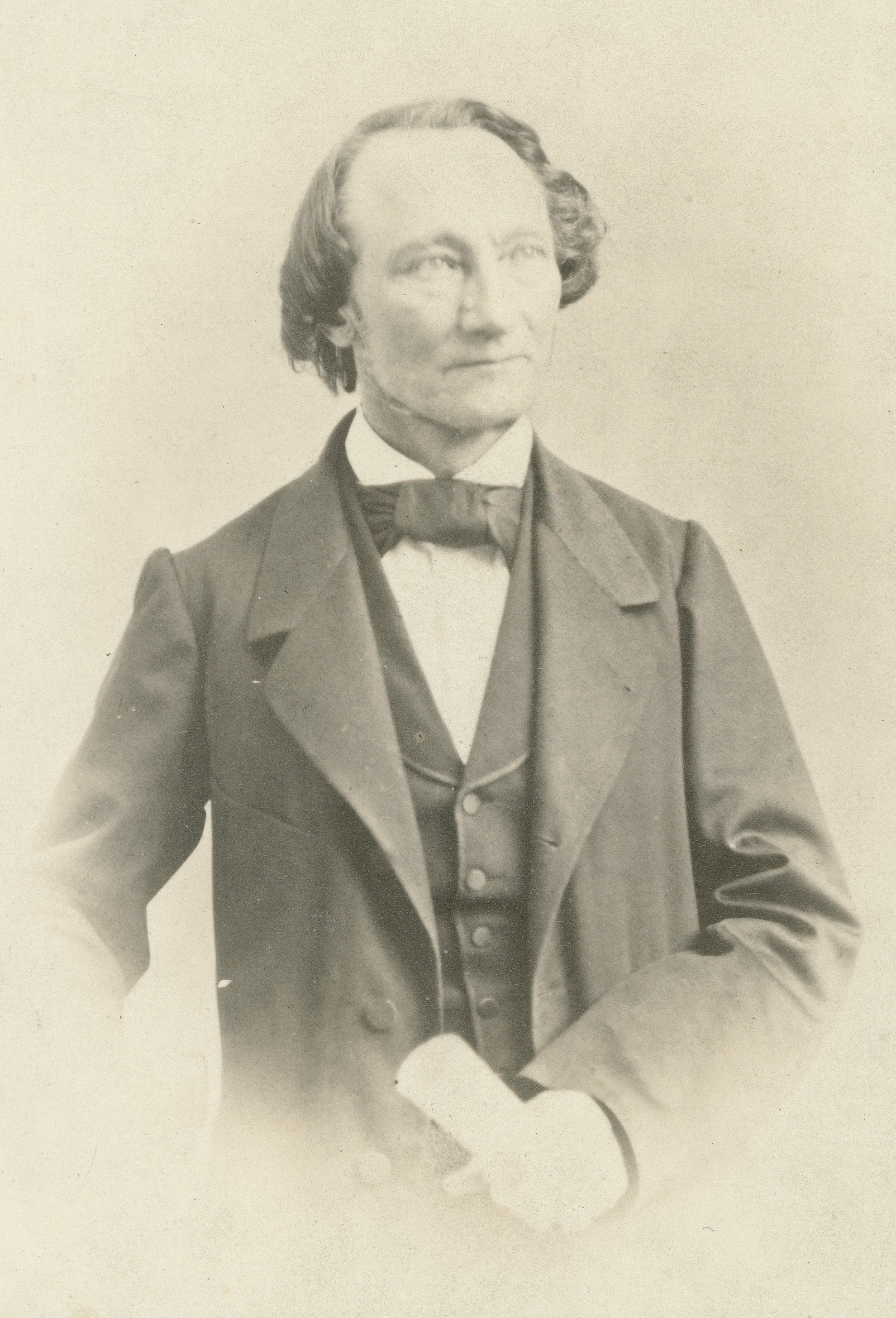
- Gottfried Ludwig Theobald, c. 1870
- Born: December 21, 1810; Allendorf, Germany
- Died: September 15, 1869 (aged 58); Chur, Switzerland
- Occupation: cartographer

Gottfried Ludwig Theobald (21 December 1810 in Allendorf – 15 September 1869 in Chur) was a German-Swiss geologist and cartographer.

He studied theology at the universities of Marburg and Halle, then served as a curate in Hanau. Being dissatisfied with this line of work, he focused his attention towards natural sciences and eventually worked as a tutor in Montpellier. From 1843 he taught classes at a secondary school in Hanau, and in 1852 relocated to Geneva as a teacher in a private school. From 1854 up until his death, he taught classes in sciences at the cantonal school in Chur.

His geological research was largely centered on the mountains of the canton of Graubünden, of which he produced highly detailed geological maps. He also provided geological descriptions of Swiss mineral springs; such as those at Tarasp, St. Moritz, Alvaneu, Rothenbrunnen and Passugg, as well as descriptions of the springs at Bormio in Italy. He was the author of over 100 writings, many of them containing detailed geological descriptions and maps. These were published in various magazines, most notably in the annual reports of the Swiss Alpine Club (1866–70) and the proceedings of the Swiss Society for Natural Sciences.

His natural history collections formed a foundation for the Rätisches Museum in Chur. The moss species Didymodon theobaldii (Pfeff., 1867) commemorates his name.

== Selected works ==
- Das Bündner Oberland; oder, Der Vorderrhein mit seinen seitenthälern, 1861 – The Bündner Oberland region; the Vorderrhein with its valleys.
- Naturbilder aus den Rhätischen Alpen : Ein Führer durch Graubünden, 1862 – Nature photos from the Rhaetian Alps: A guide to Graubünden.
- Geologische Beschreibung der nordoestlichen Gebirge von Graubünden, mit zwei Karten und Druchschnitten, 1863 – Geological description of the northeastern mountains of Graubünden.
- Geologische Beschreibung der in den Blättern X und XV des Eid. Atlasses enthalt. Gebirge von Graubunden, 1863 – Geological description of sheets X and XV of the Eid. atlas containing the mountains of Graubunden.
- Bormio und seine Bäder, 1865 – Bormio and its spas.
- Die südöstlichen Gebirge von Graubünden und dem angrenzenden Veltlin, 1866 – The southeastern mountains of Graubünden and the neighboring Valtellina.
- Landschaftsbilder, Bergfahrten und naturwissenschaftliche Skizzen, 1868 – Landscapes, mountain trips and scientific sketches.
