= Rut Plouda =

Swiss author and poet

- Children: 3
- Awards: Schiller award 2001

Rut Plouda (born 18 August 1948; pronounced [ru:t 'plou̯dɐ]) is a Swiss author and poet who writes in the Vallader dialect of the Romansh language.

== Early life ==
Plouda was born in Tarasp, Grisons, to parents who were both teachers. She was the third of four daughters. After completing her mandatory education, she attended a teacher training college in Chur before teaching in Savognin and Ftan.

== Career ==
After the publication of her first book, La Bos-cha Tuorna a Flurir, in 1984, Plouda made regular appearances on Romansh radio. She has since been regarded as an important figure for the promotion of the Romansh language by the Swiss national radio station Schweizer Radio DRS, and its successor, SRF.

The death of Plouda's 19-year-old son, who had Down syndrome, in 1996, was the inspiration for her book As Though Nothing Were (original title: Sco Scha Nüglia nu Füss), published in 2000. The book won the Schiller award in 2001, and has since been translated into German, French and English.

The audiobook version of As Though Nothing Were was the first ever audiobook published in the Vallader dialect, and the second in the Romansh language overall. In 2008, Plouda collaborated with the Geneva-based band Tiger the Lion for their songs S'co Scha Nüglia nu Füss and Las Stailas, based on As Though Nothing Were.
