= Eduard Killias =

Eduard Killias (1 March 1829, in Chur – 14 November 1891, in Chur) was a Swiss physician and naturalist.

He studied medicine in Tübingen, Zurich, Bern, Prague and Vienna, obtaining his doctorate in medicine and surgery in 1852. Afterwards, he worked as a physician in his hometown of Chur and as a balneologist in Tarasp. He was long-time president of the Naturforschenden Gesellschaft Graubündens (1859–1891) and also served as vice-president of the Historisch-Antiquarischen Gesellschaft Graubündens.

He was the author of several works on bryophytes native to the canton of Graubünden, and in the field of entomology, he was principal author of the five-volume "Beiträge zu einem Verzeichnisse der Insectenfauna Graubündens". His studies on the mineral waters at Tarasp were later translated into English and published as "Tarasp and its mineral waters" (Nettleton Balme Whitby; publisher: London: Bosworth, 1870).

Taxa with the specific epithet of killiasii are named after him, an example being the moss species, Orthotrichum killiasii (Müll.Hal.).

== Botanical works ==
- Verzeichniss der bündnerischen Laubmoose. — Jahresbericht der Naturforschenden Gesellschaft Graubündens n. F. 4: 77–134. (1859) – Directory of Graubünden mosses.
- Beiträge zur rhätischen Flora. — Jahresbericht der Naturforschenden Gesellschaft Graubündens n. F. 5: 71–81. (1860) Contributions to Rhaetian flora.
- Zweiter Nachtrag zu den Moos- und Flechtenverzeichnissen. — Jahresbericht der Naturforschenden Gesellschaft Graubündens n. F. 6: 245–251. (1861) – Second addendum to moss and lichen directories.
- Laubmoose. (unter: Beiträge zur bündnerischen Kryptogamenflora). — Jahresbericht der Naturforschenden Gesellschaft Graubündens n. F. 11: 183–188. (1866) – Mosses, Contributions to Graubünden cryptogamic flora
- Lebermoose. (unter: Beiträge zur bündnerischen Kryptogamenflora). — Jahresbericht der Naturforschenden Gesellschaft Graubündens n. F. 11: 189–200. (1866) – Liverworts, Contributions to Graubünden cryptogamic flora.
- Die Flora des Unterengadins. — Jahresbericht der Naturforschenden Gesellschaft Graubündens n. F. 31 (Beilage): I–LXXV, 1–266. (1888) – The flora of the Lower Engadine.
