= Martin Killias =

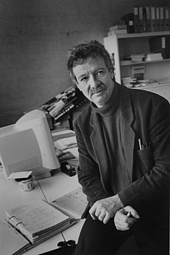

Christoph Martin Killias (born March 29, 1948, in Zurich, Switzerland) is a Swiss criminologist who has been a permanent visiting professor at the University of St. Gallen's law school since 2013. He is also the co-chair of the Campbell Collaboration's Crime and Justice Group.

== Career ==
From 1986 to 2006, Killias was a professor of Criminal Law, Criminal Procedural Law and Criminology at the University of Lausanne and Director of that University’s Institute of Criminology and Criminal Law. From 1984 to 2008, he was also a part-time judge at the Swiss Federal Court.

== Research ==
One study conducted by Killias looked at 18 different countries and found a moderate correlation between gun ownership rates and homicide rates across these countries, as well as a much stronger correlation between gun ownership rates and suicide rates. Another study by him found that gun ownership in Switzerland may have increased domestic crime rates in that country.

== Views on gun violence ==
Killias has said that "the fewer guns there are in cellars, attics and armoires, then that would be helpful, because there is a strong correlation between guns kept in private homes and incidences occurring at home - like private disputes involving the husband shooting the wife and maybe the children, and then committing suicide." He has also said that as the Swiss government reduced the size of its Army, gun violence rates in that country have dropped. In response to those who cite Switzerland as evidence that guns deter violence, Killias has said that in Switzerland, "We have guns at home, but they are kept for peaceful purposes. There is no point taking the gun out of your home in Switzerland because it is illegal to carry a gun in the street. To shoot someone who just looks at you in a funny way - this is not Swiss culture!"

== Honors and awards ==
In 2001, Killias received the Sellin-Glueck Award from the American Society of Criminology. In 2008, he received the G.O.W. Mueller Award for outstanding research in international criminal law from the Academy of Criminal Justice Sciences. In 2013, he received an honorary doctorate from the Panteion University of Athens. In 2017, he received the Beccaria Medal in Gold from the Deutsche Kriminologische Gesellschaft. In 2020, Killias received the award for the Distinguished Services to the European Society of Criminology Award in recognition of outstanding service contributions to its effective functioning.
