= Ulla Engeberg Killias =

Ulla Engeberg Killias (1945–1995) was a Swedish-born painter who lived in Switzerland for most of her adult life.

== Life and work ==
Killias was born in Stockholm, Sweden, where she also earned her baccalaureate in painting and drawing. She first moved to Switzerland in 1965, when she began her studies at the University of Zurich. She stayed there until 1975, studying art history and German studies, and completing an internship in the field of child psychology.

She married Heinrich Sattler, adopted two children, and moved to St. Gallen, where she assumed the position of senior teacher at a children's therapeutic center. She also continued to study drawing and painting.

After her divorce from Heinrich Sattler in 1977, she married Heinz Killias and lived with him at his home in Bilten. Here she worked as a freelance artist on the restoration of historic buildings.

In 1985, she was diagnosed with leukemia. In 1986, she was invited to participate in a touring exhibition in Denmark called "4 Swiss artists." In 1988, she designed the set for the production of the opera Ondine by ETA Hoffmann in Mitlödi. That same year, she opened a painting studio for children, young people, and adults in Netstal. In 1990, she earned her diploma as a painting teacher from the Institute for Humanistic Art Therapy in Zurich. She opened a second art studio, for students and teachers, in Glarus.

In 1992, she launched a program for art therapy for cancer patients in collaboration with the Cancer League of Glarus. That same year, she suffered a relapse of leukemia but opened yet another painting studio in Zurich - with Evi Forgo. Her last solo exhibition was in 1994 in Seon. Her last travels took her to El Hierro and Castagneto Carducci.

She is buried in Glarus's city cemetery.
