= Heliswiss =

Swiss helicopter operator

IATA	ICAO	Call sign
-	HSI	HELISWISS
- Founded: 1953
- Headquarters: Bern Airport (canton of Bern), Switzerland
- Website: heliswissinternational.ch

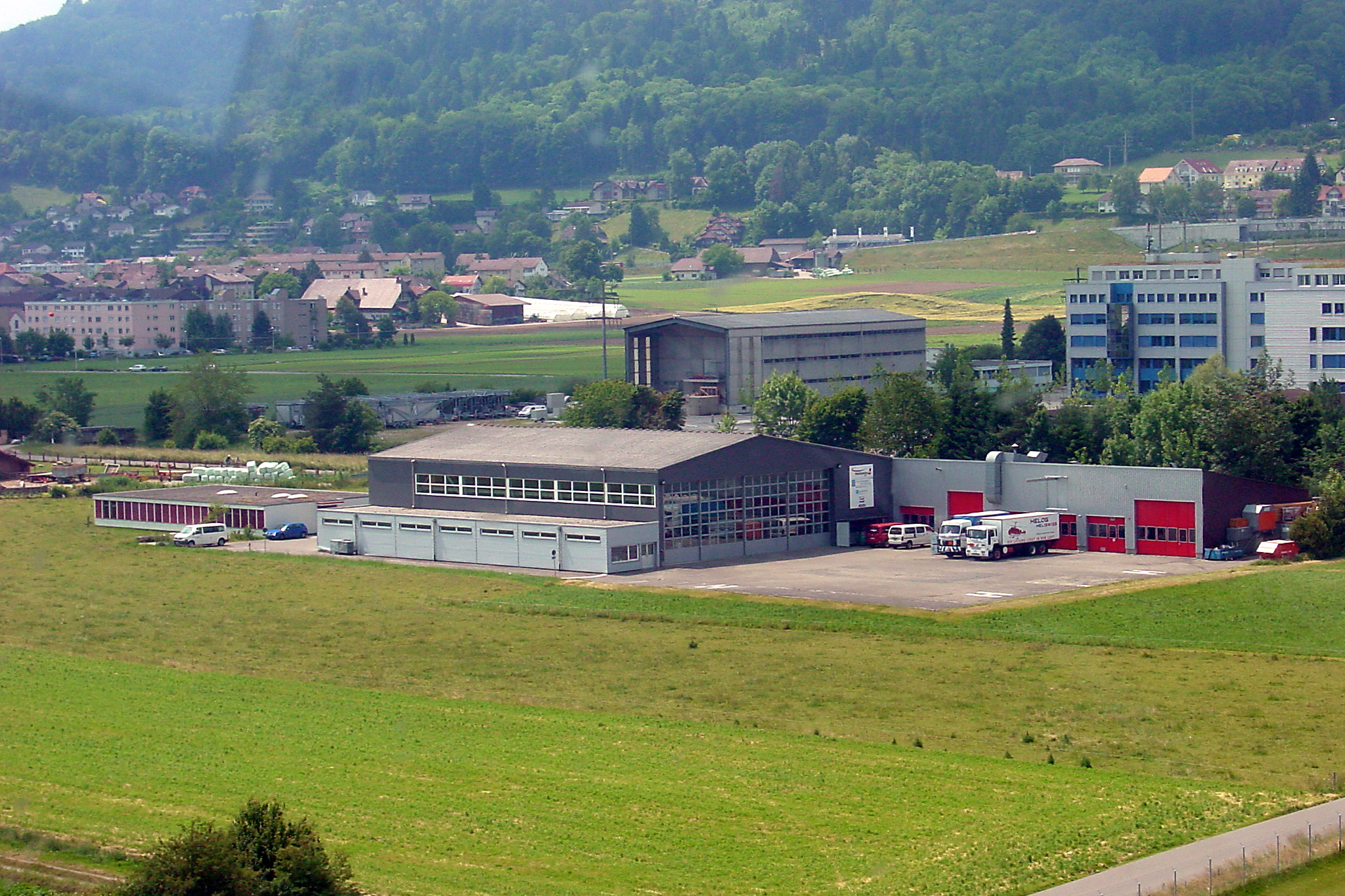
Heliswiss Headquarters at Berne-Belp

Heliswiss AG is a Swiss helicopter company with headquarters on the property of Bern Airport in Belp, Switzerland, near Bern.

== History ==
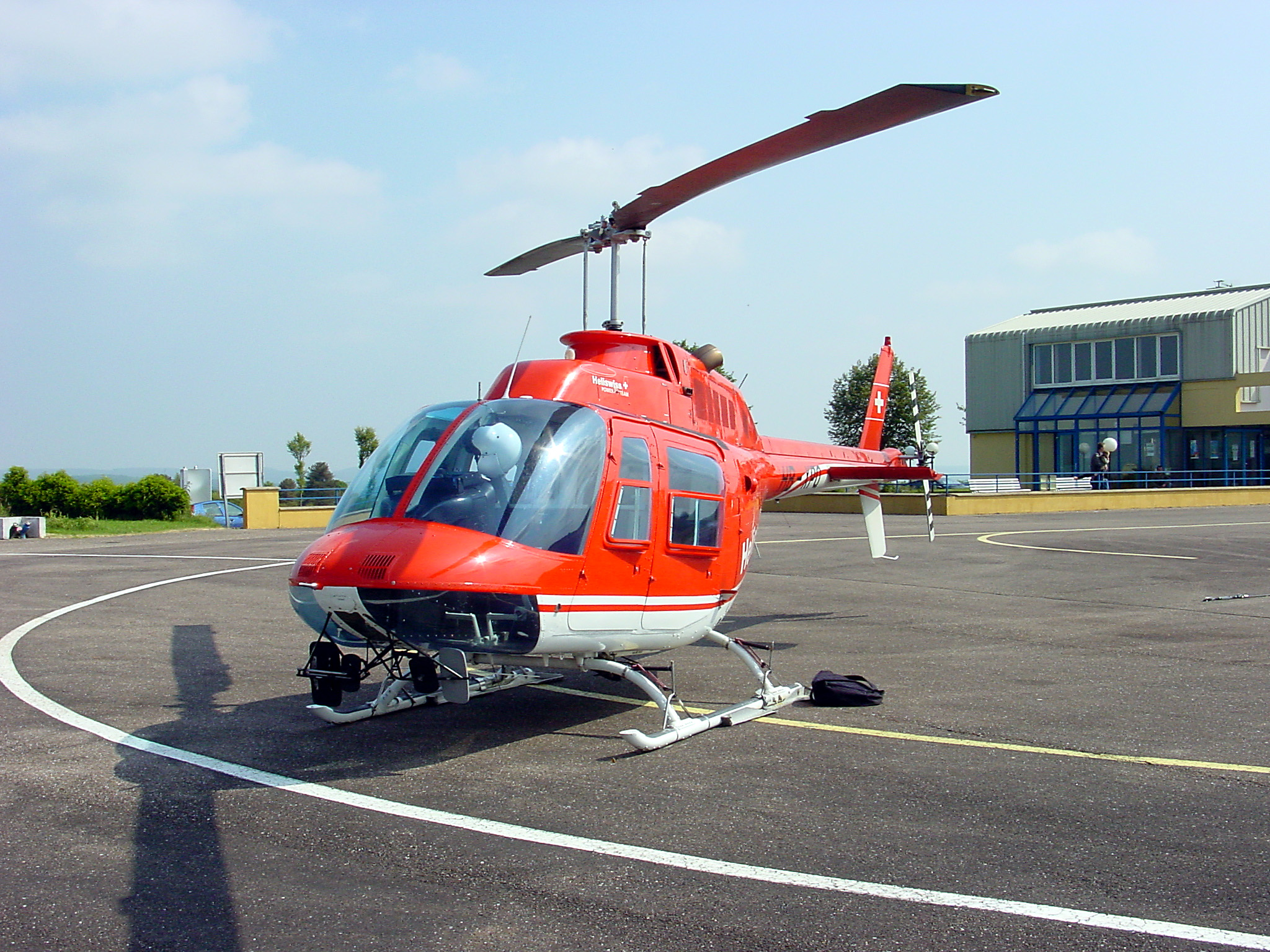
Agusta-Bell 206B Jet Ranger

Heliswiss - the oldest helicopter company in Switzerland - was founded as "Heliswiss Schweizerische Helikopter AG" with headquarters in Berne-Belp on April 17, 1953. This was the beginning of helicopter flying in Switzerland. During the following years Heliswiss expanded in Switzerland and formed a network with bases in Belp BE, Samedan GR, Domat Ems GR, Locarno TI, Erstfeld UR, Gampel VS, Gstaad BE and Gruyères FR.

During the build-up of the rescue-company Schweizerische Rettungsflugwacht (REGA) as an independent network, Heliswiss carried out rescue missions on their behalf.

Heliswiss carried out operations all over the world: in Greenland, Suriname, North Africa and South America.

The first helicopter owned by Heliswiss was a Bell 47 G-1. It was registered as HB-XAG on September 23, 1953. From 1963 Heliswiss started to expand and began to operate with medium helicopters like the Agusta Bell 204B with a turbine power of 1050 HP and an external load of up to 1500 kg. From 1979 Heliswiss operated a Bell 214 (external load up to 2.8 t). Since 1991 Heliswiss operates a Russian Kamov 32A12 which was joined by a second one in 2015.

== Current fleet ==
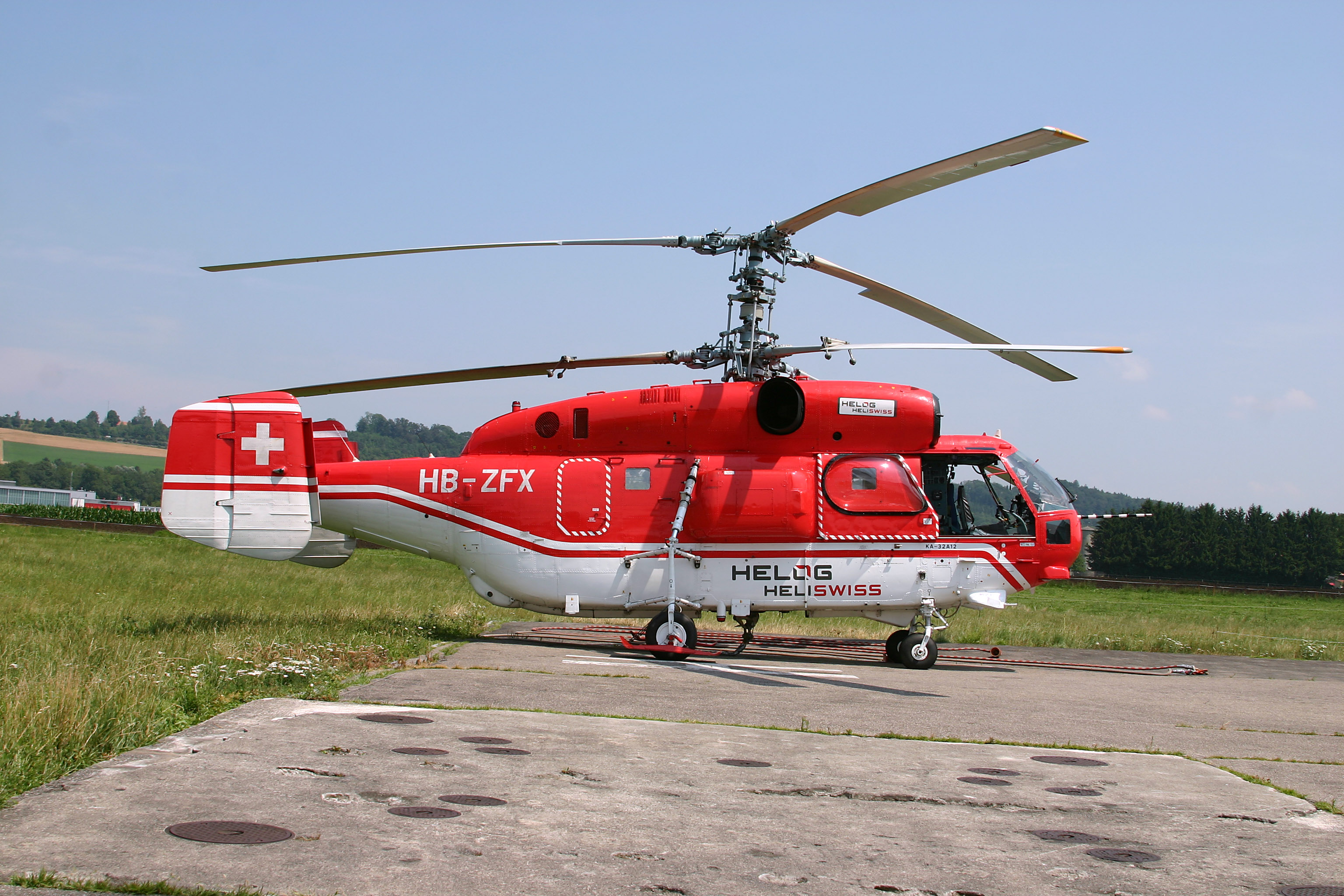
The heavy helicopter Kamov 32A12 HB-ZFX is operated by Heliswiss International AG.

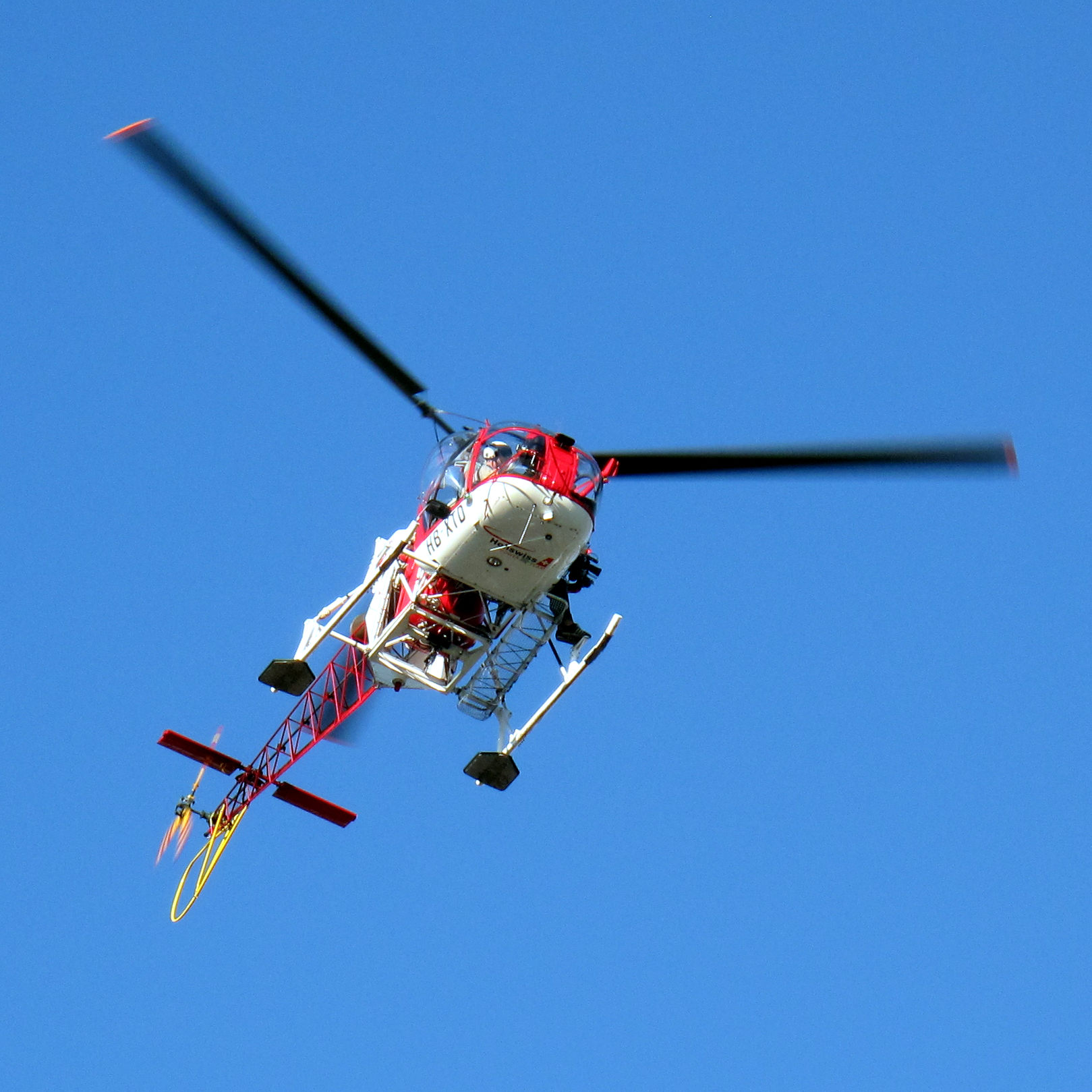
Aérospatiale Lama

Swiss Helicopter's fleet comprises some 36 helicopters (as at December 2013):

Heliwiss fleet
Aircraft	In Fleet	Passengers	Notes
AS350B3,D2	17	5	
Aerospatiale SA 315B Lama	1	4	
Eurocopter EC120 Colibri	5	4	
Bell 206	2	4	
Kamov KA-32A12	2	16	operated by Heliswiss International AG
Schweizer 269/300 C	3	2	
Super Puma	1	19	
EC130	1	6	
Guimbal Cabri G2	2	1	
EC135	1	7	
Total	36		

== Bases ==
Flughafen Bern-Belp, Samedan GR, Domat/Ems GR, Locarno Airport, Erstfeld UR, Gampel VS and Gruyères FR.

- Gstaad BE(winter base)

== Products ==
- Flight-training (basic training, commercial pilot, mountain training, night-flight)
- Charter flights
- VIP-flights
- Heli-skiing
- Film- and foto-flights
- External load flights (up to 5000 kg), logging
- Firefighting

== Partners/Subsidiaries ==
- Air Grischa
- BOHAG
- Heli Gotthard
- Heliswiss International AG
- Eliticino
- Air Zermatt AG
- Rhein-Helikopter AG (Liechtenstein only)
