= Johann Franz Fetz =

Swiss-Liechtensteiner priest (1809–1884)

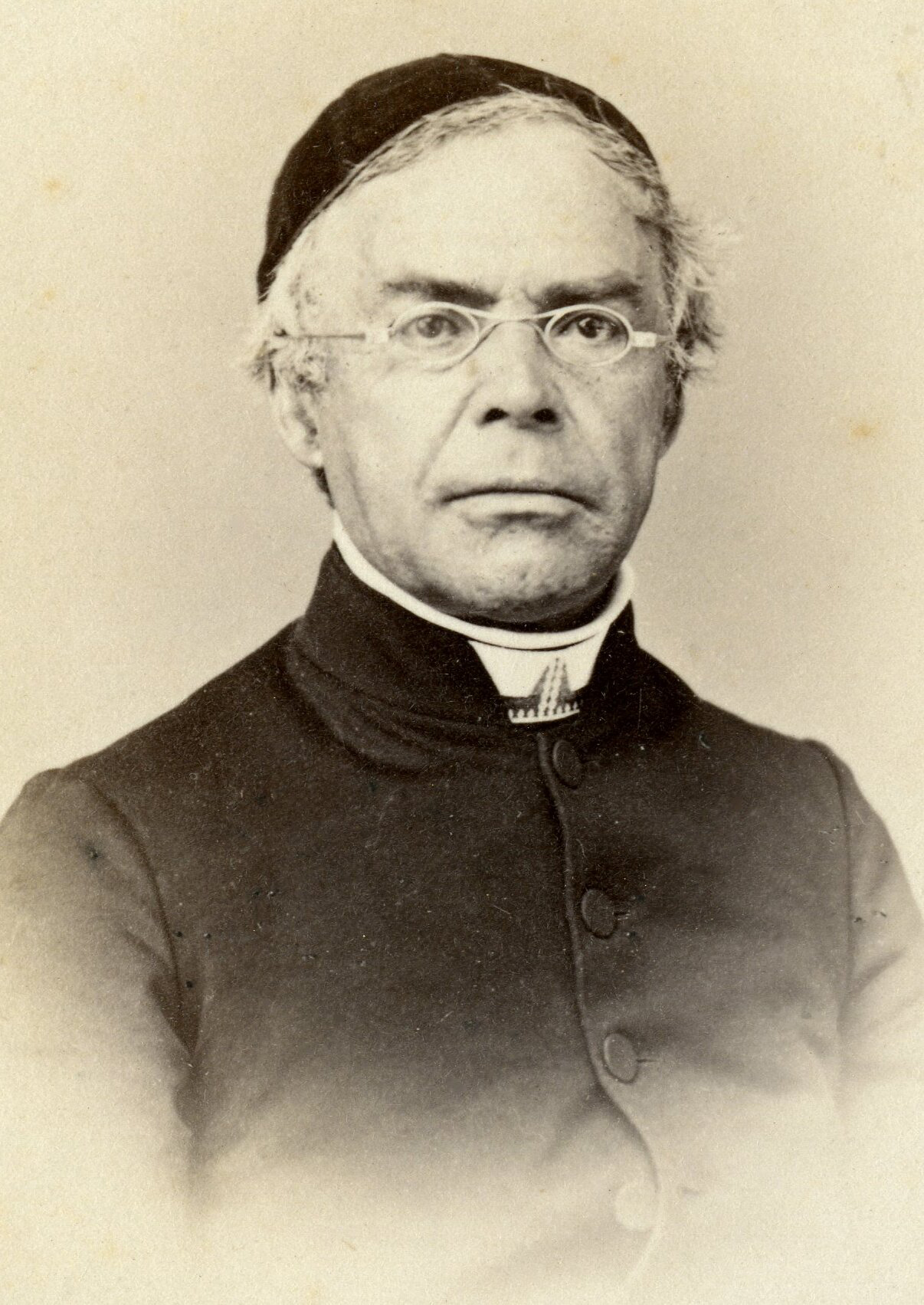
- Fetz in 1875
- Born: 21 November 1809; Domat/Ems, Swiss Confederation
- Died: 18 June 1884 (aged 74); Vaduz, Liechtenstein
- Occupations: Priest, historian, journalist

Johann Franz Fetz (21 November 1809 – 18 June 1884) was a Swiss-Liechtensteiner priest, historian and journalist.

== Life ==
Fetz was born in Domat/Ems and studied theology in Chur. He was ordained as a priest on 5 October 1834 and was then a pastor in Switzerland from 1835 to 1849. He moved to Liechtenstein and was chaplain in the capital of Vaduz from 1852 to this death in 1884. During this time, he oversaw the establishment of a cemetery and the construction of Vaduz Cathedral, which was completed in 1873 and led to the elevation of the curacy of Vaduz to a parish the same year.

Fetz founded the Catholic conservative newspaper Liechtensteiner Volksblatt in 1878, and was its first editor until 1884. He was also a contributor to histography in Liechtenstein, publishing several books on the matter. In 1882, he published the book Leitfaden zur Geschichte des Fürstenthums Liechtenstein: Geschichte der alten St. Florins-Kapelle und der neuen Pfarrkirche zu Vaduz (Guide to the History of the Principality of Liechtenstein: History of the Old St. Florins Chapel and the New Parish Church in Vaduz) was the second major publication on Liechtenstein's history, behind Peter Kaiser in 1847.

In 1880, he became a non-resident canon of the Chur Cathedral Chapter. He died on 18 June 1884, aged 74.

== See also ==
- Vaduz Cathedral
- Liechtensteiner Volksblatt
