= Kamov Ka-32 =

Soviet transport helicopter

Ka-32
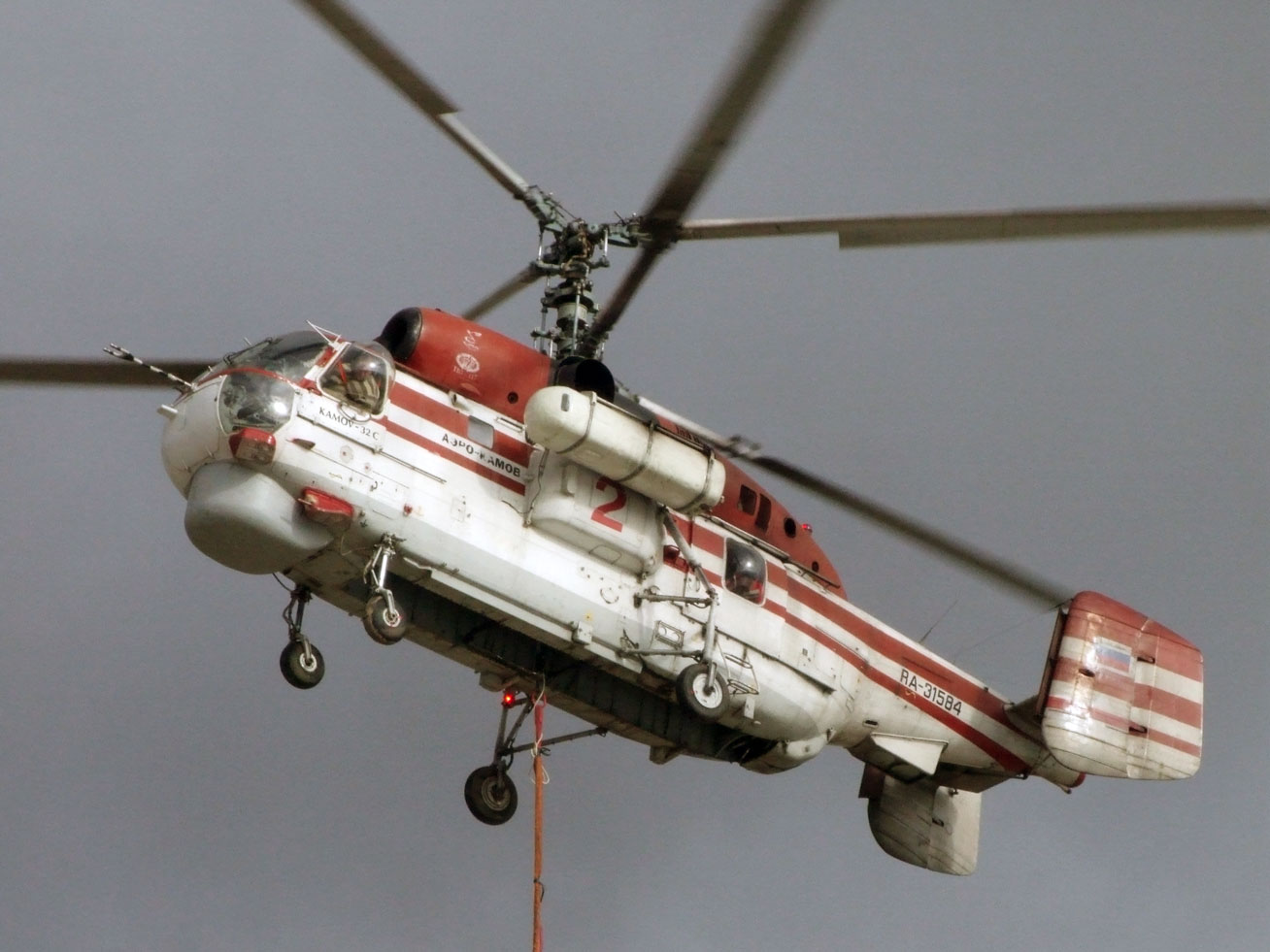
- Ka-32S

General information
- Type: Civilian utility helicopter
- National origin: Soviet Union / Russia
- Manufacturer: Kamov; KumAPP
- Status: In service
- Primary users: Republic of Korea Air Force Korea Coast Guard
- Number built: 160+

History
- Manufactured: 1985–present
- Introduction date: 1985
- First flight: 24 December 1973
- Developed from: Kamov Ka-27

The Kamov Ka-32 (Russian: Камов Ка-32, NATO reporting name "Helix-C") is a Soviet and Russia medium transport helicopter with a coaxial design and two turboshaft engines and fixed landing gear.

The Ka-32 is a civilian development of the Ka-27PS search and rescue helicopter, developed by the Kamov Design Bureau taking into account the successful operation of the Ka-25 and Ka-27 helicopter family from the decks of ships.

== Design and development ==
The start of the development of the Ka-32 helicopter should be considered, as for the Ka-27 helicopter, to be 1969.

Initially, the main purpose of the Ka-32 was supposed to be its use for reconnaissance of ice conditions in the extreme northern conditions of the Arctic during the day and night, but later it was decided to develop the helicopter for multi-purpose all-weather use: for search and rescue operations, transport, unloading ships and servicing drilling platforms, crane work during equipment installation, removal of valuable timber packages, patrol service and other purposes.

It was decided to equip the helicopter with a sophisticated flight and navigation system with an onboard computer, surveillance radar, anti-icing systems and special equipment. The absence of weapons and anti-submarine search equipment and related systems on the helicopter allowed the use of internal volumes for placing fuel tanks and various equipment for civilian use and ensured an increase in the helicopter's lifting capacity.

The first flight of the experimental Ka-32 helicopter took place on 24 December 1973 (test pilot E. I. Laryushin). The first flight of the serial Ka-32 helicopter took place in 1980.

At the end of 1978, the experimental Ka-32 helicopter was used for the first time in the history of Arctic exploration to escort the nuclear icebreaker Sibir with a convoy of ships through polar night conditions.

In 1981, the Ka-32 helicopter was first demonstrated to foreign specialists in Minsk at a conference on the use of civil aviation in the national economy, and in 1985 at the Paris Aviation and Space Exhibition and later at many other exhibitions.

== Production ==
Since 1985, Ka-32 helicopters have been mass-produced by JSC KumAPP. By 2006, about 160 Ka-32 helicopters in various modifications had been produced, and production continues.

In 2013, an agreement was signed with the Yitong Corporation (China) on the possibility of assembling Ka-32A11BC helicopters in China.

== Variants ==
Since 2010, only helicopters of the Ka-32A and Ka-32A11BC modifications have been produced. Since 2011, only the Ka-32A11BC has been produced.

=== Ka-32 ===
General designation. It most often refers to helicopters of the Ka-32T or Ka-32S modification. Historically, it comes from the times when other modifications did not exist.

=== Ka-32A ===
Modification of the Ka-32T helicopter to meet certification requirements. It is a more profound modification compared to the Ka-32AO. The modification differs from the Ka-32AO in the composition of the instrument equipment, ensuring the performance of flights under IFR during the day and night; an improved system of total and static pressure to improve the accuracy of measurements; as well as lightning protection of the radio equipment units. The helicopter has a transport category type certificate and served as the basis for the emergence of new similar helicopters.

=== Ka-32A1 ===
A modification of the Ka-32A helicopter for the Moscow Fire Service. Developed in 1993. The helicopter is designed to evacuate people and extinguish fires of varying complexity, including in high-rise buildings.

The helicopter differs from the basic version in additional communications equipment, a specialized fire extinguishing system, the installation of two searchlights and a loudspeaker for the external warning system. To fight fires, the helicopter is equipped with portable fire extinguishers, aerosol grenades and a horizontal hydraulic gun. The fire-fighting equipment can be supplemented with a water drainage device (a suspended tank with a capacity of up to 5,000 liters). To evacuate people from burning buildings, various transport and rescue cabins installed on an external sling are used. Parachuteless landing of fire brigades in hovering mode is carried out using descent devices. The helicopter has a characteristic red and white coloring.

=== Ka-32A2 ===
A modification of the Ka-32A helicopter for law enforcement agencies. Developed in 1994 for the Moscow Main Directorate of Internal Affairs. The helicopter was designed to transport service personnel, search for criminal groups and airdrop special forces personnel.

The helicopter differs from the basic version in its modified fuel system, additional communications equipment, installation of searchlights and two loudspeakers for the external warning system. The helicopter's fuel system does not include fuel tanks No. 5 (on the sides of the fuselage); the existing fuel tanks are filled with polyurethane foam. The external lighting equipment is supplemented with two searchlights: in the forward part of the fuselage and on a movable truss in the cargo door opening on the left side. Parachute-free airdrop of special forces personnel in hover mode is carried out through the door opening of the transport cabin using descent devices. To enable the personnel to use weapons, the helicopter is equipped with pintle mounts for machine guns or assault rifles. The helicopter has a spotted camouflage paint job. One helicopter was built; it was later converted back into a civilian Ka-32A.

=== Ka-32A4 ===
Modification of the Ka-32S helicopter for the Republic of Korea Armed Forces. The Korean designation of the helicopter is HH-32A. The helicopter is additionally equipped with a weather radar, an onboard computer with an MFI, a searchlight, short-range navigation and landing systems VOR/ILS, and foreign radio stations. The helicopter was developed at KumAPP JSC together with Israeli firms.

=== Ka-32A6 ===
A passenger helicopter project based on the Ka-32A. The project featured an enlarged fuselage (transport cabin), adapted for passenger transportation. No helicopters were built according to this project.

=== Ka-32A11BC ===
A modification of the Ka-32A helicopter based on the results of certification in Canada in 1998. Hence the letters "BC" in the modification designation - from British Columbia. The helicopter has a two-chamber steering system (power steering unit), an updated set of equipment and color marking of instruments in accordance with the requirements of foreign standards. The helicopter is produced in two main instrumentation options: with analog instruments in the cockpit and with an MFI. Until 2011, the helicopter modification was distinguished by increased resources and service life of the main components. The helicopter is actively used for transporting cargo on an external sling, including timber skidding, construction and installation work and fire extinguishing. It is possible to install various optional equipment of Russian and foreign manufacture. Until 2011, the helicopter was supplied only for export. The helicopter of this modification is certified in Australia, Brazil, Europe, Canada, China, South Korea and Japan.

=== Ka-32A11M ===
Modification proposed for the modernization of the Ka-32 fleet of South Korea (the plans also include the modernization of the helicopter fleet of the main operators in South Korea, Europe, Turkey and China). It involves the installation of a more powerful VK-2500PS-02 engine, new fire-fighting equipment and avionics.

=== Ka-32A12 ===
Version of the Ka-32A11BC helicopter for Switzerland. Until 2011, the helicopter was considered an independent model, created on the basis of the Ka-32A11BC. Since 2011, the Ka-32A12 has been considered a modification (separate version) of the Ka-32A11BC and is included in a single type certificate with it. The modification is distinguished by a modified composition of the instrumentation, developed jointly with the operator Heliswiss. Three helicopters were produced. The helicopters have the red and white corporate coloring of the operator.

=== Ka-32AM ===
Designation of the Ka-32A helicopter project with increased lifting capacity of 7,000 kg.

=== Ka-32A-O ===
Early model designation: Ka-32A-O. Often incorrectly designated as Ka-32A0. Modification of the Ka-32T helicopter in order to meet certification requirements. The helicopter is equipped with certified TV3-117VMA main engines (TV3-117VMA series 02). Additionally installed: an ATC transponder and a heat-resistant shockproof tape recorder. Titanium sheet protection is installed under the main and auxiliary engines. The helicopter's electrical systems are divided into starboard and left-hand systems. The external suspension system is additionally equipped with an emergency release mechanism. Color markings are applied to the instrument scales in the cockpit. The helicopter is certified by the AR IAC and has a limited category type certificate for the carriage of cargo, provided that visual flights are performed during the day. The letter "O" in the helicopter designation comes from the category designation.

=== Ka-32K ===
The helicopter is a specialized version of the Ka-32T for performing complex construction and installation work ("flying crane"). This modification is distinguished by an additional semi-retractable operator's cabin, located in the rear part of the fuselage. The helicopter is equipped with a fundamentally new fly-by-wire control system (FDCS), allowing piloting from both the main pilot's cabin and the additional operator's cabin. There is an automatic system for damping vibrations of the cable with a load on the external sling and a system for automatically maintaining a constant angle of the tensioned cable connected to the load located on the ground. To monitor the load, the helicopter is equipped with a television system, which consists of two television cameras: a movable one in the longitudinal plane, installed under the tail unit, and a fixed one, placed vertically inside the fuselage near the external sling cable. Both television cameras have adjustable diaphragms and focal lengths. In the pilot's cabin there are two television screens: one for the helicopter commander and one for the second pilot. Each TV screen can display an image from any of the TV cameras. One prototype of this modification of the helicopter was built. The first flight took place on 28 December 1991. The helicopter was first shown at the aerospace exhibition in Berlin in 1992.

=== Ka-32S ===
Modification of the helicopter for use on ships for ice reconnaissance and search and rescue operations, transportation of cargo on an external sling, transportation of passengers. The helicopter can service drilling rigs and platforms on the shelf, unload ships. As a search and rescue helicopter, the helicopter is equipped with additional rescue, medical and lighting equipment. The helicopter is the same type as the Ka-32T.

=== Ka-32SI ===
Designation of the Ka-32S helicopter, designed to conduct environmental studies of water surfaces. The helicopter was equipped with the GEVK-1 geological and environmental complex and a high-capacity fuel system (with additional tanks No. 7). In 1993, one Ka-32S helicopter RA-31584 (serial number 8706) was equipped. Subsequently, due to the closure of the program, the geological and environmental complex was dismantled from the helicopter. The helicopter retained the designation Ka-32S.

=== Ka-32T ===
A transport modification of the helicopter for transporting large-sized cargo on an external sling, transporting people and cargo in the transport cabin. It differs from the Ka-32S by the absence of the Octopus locator and its fairing in the nose. Also, the helicopter is not equipped with search and rescue equipment. The helicopter is identical to the Ka-32S.

=== Ka-32T/S ===
Universal designation for the same type of helicopters Ka-32T and Ka-32S.

== Operators ==
=== Civil ===
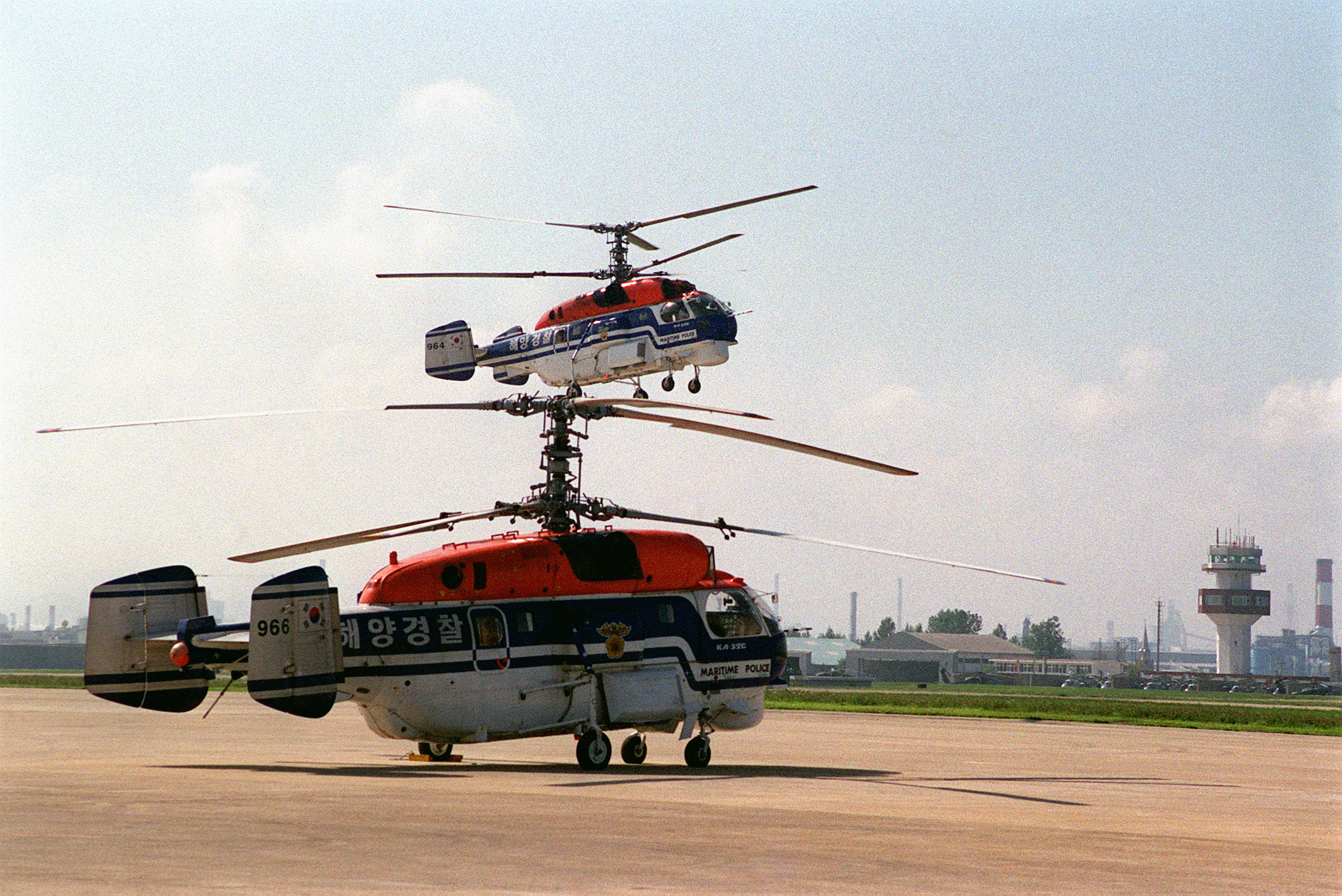
Two Ka-32 from the Korea Coast Guard.

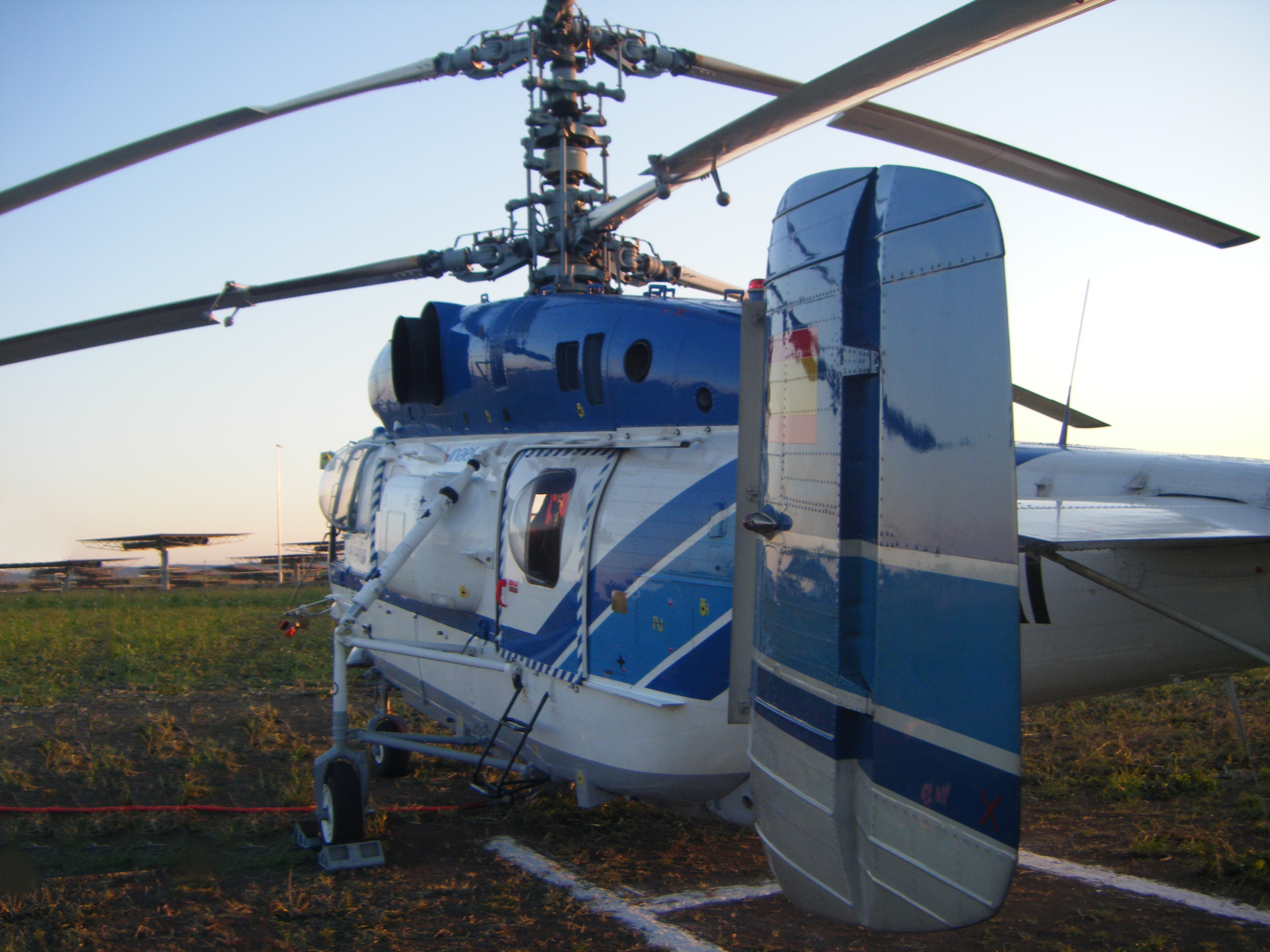
Ka-32 A11 BC from Spanish company Babcock Spain.

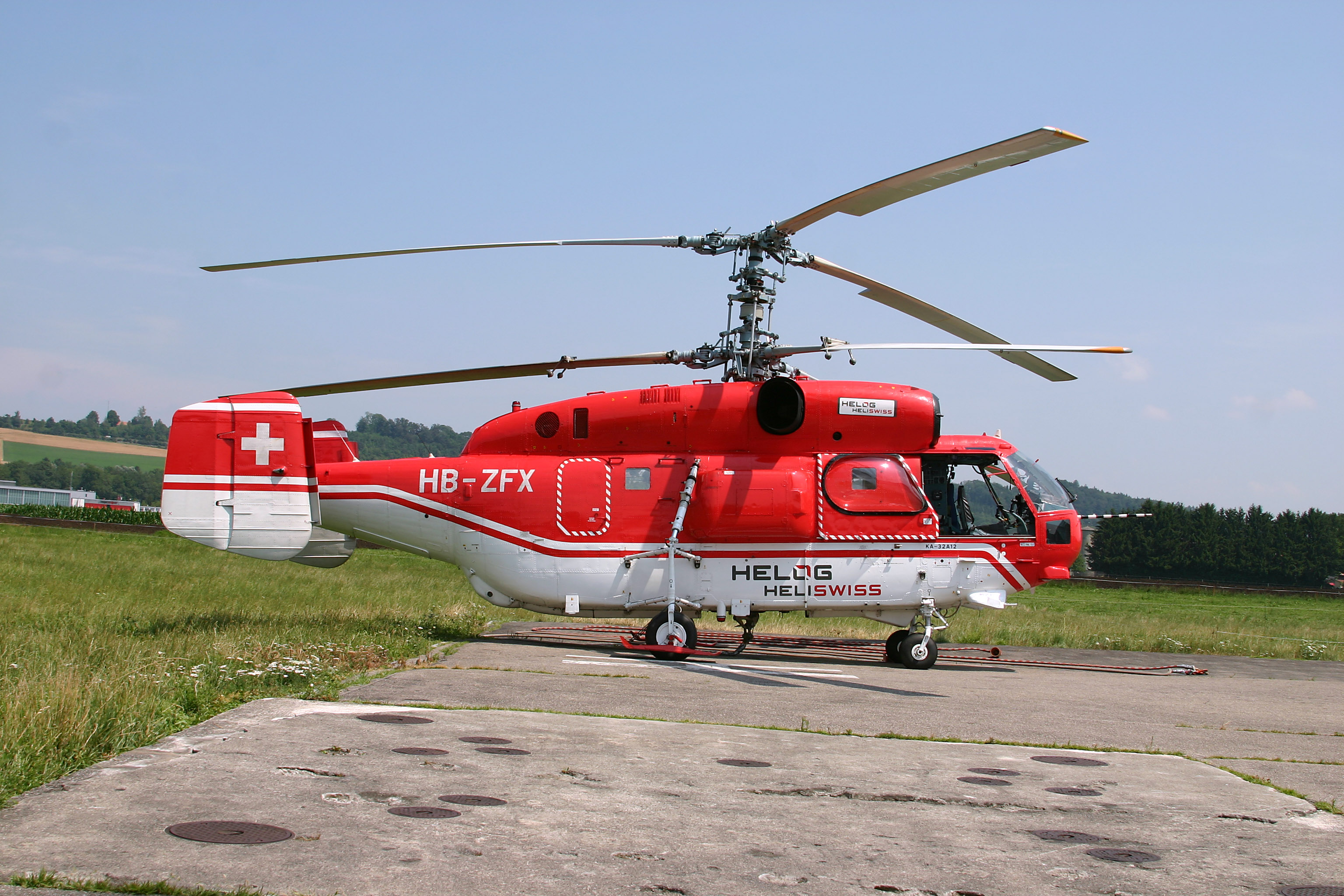
Helog Heliswiss Ka-32A12 in 2009.

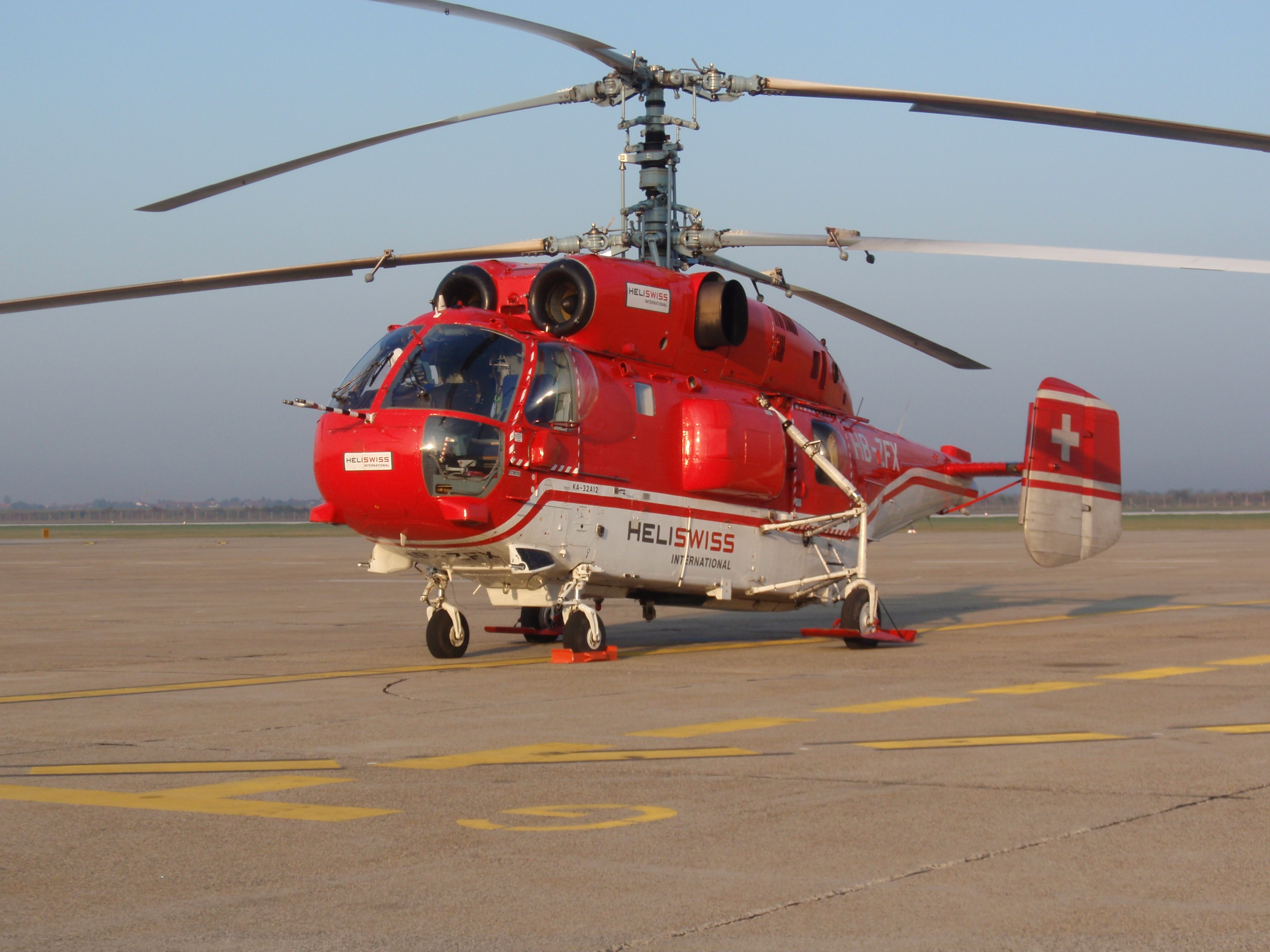
Heliswiss Ka-32 in 2009.

Canada

- Vancouver Island Helicopters (VIH) operates 3 Ka-32 A11 BC helicopters.

China

- Sunrise Airlines Company operates 1 Ka-32 A11 BC helicopter (B-77999) for cargo transport, which is property of VIH (from Canada), rented since 2001.

Indonesia

- National Agency for Disaster Countermeasure operates Ka-32 via wet lease to fight forest fires.

Japan

- Akagi Helicopter operates 1 helicopter.

Portugal

- Portugal operated 6 Ka-32 A11 BC helicopters to fight forest fires; they were transferred to Ukraine in 2024.

Russia

- Omega Helicopters operates several Ka-32S helicopters.

Serbia

- Serbian Police Helicopter Unit operates 2 Ka-32A11BC helicopters to fight forest fires.

South Africa

- South African AIRREP.

South Korea

- The Coastal Guard and Forest Service of South Korea operate a total of 36 Ka-32 helicopters.The Forest Service operates 29 Ka-32.

Spain

- Babcock Spain (previously, INAER Group) operates 10 Ka-32 A11 BC helicopters to fight against forest fires.

Switzerland

- Helog Heliswiss operates the Ka-32 A12 variant.
- Heliswiss operates the Ka-32T variant.

Turkey

- The Turkish Environmental Ministry operates 8 Ka-32 helicopters to fight against forest fires.

Thailand

- The Department of Disaster Prevention and Mitigation (DDPM) under the Ministry of Interior operates four Kamov Ka-32A11BC multirole.

Iran

- He has imported several Helicopter for civilian and perhaps military use.

=== Military ===
Algeria

- Algerian Air Force operates 4 Ka-32T as of 2024

Indonesia

- Indonesian Army

Laos

- Lao People's Liberation Army Air Force

South Korea

- Republic of Korea Air Force operates 8 Ka-32А4 as of 2024

Ukraine

- Ukrainian Navy operates 6 Ka-32A11BC as of 2025 supply by Portugal

Vietnam

- Vietnam People's Navy operates 1 Ka-32T as of 2025

=== Possible operators ===
Indonesia

- Indonesia plans to acquire Ka-32 helicopters for evacuation services, search and rescue, cargo, and forest firefighting; and for the Indonesian Police.

Iran

- Iran plans to manufacture at least 50 Ka-32 helicopters under license from the Russian manufacturer.

== Accidents and incidents ==
- Vietnam People's Navy lost one Ka-32T helicopter with serial number 7551 crashed during a training flight and currently Vietnam only has one Ka-32T with serial number 7552 left.
- An Artic Group Ka-32S, registration UR-CIT, was lost after it caught fire while conducting an engine test at Sultan Abdul Aziz Shah Airport, Malaysia on August 15, 2026. No casualties were reported.

== See also ==
- Coaxial-rotor aircraft
- List of rotorcraft
- List of military aircraft of the Soviet Union and the CIS
