= Malix =

- Former municipality
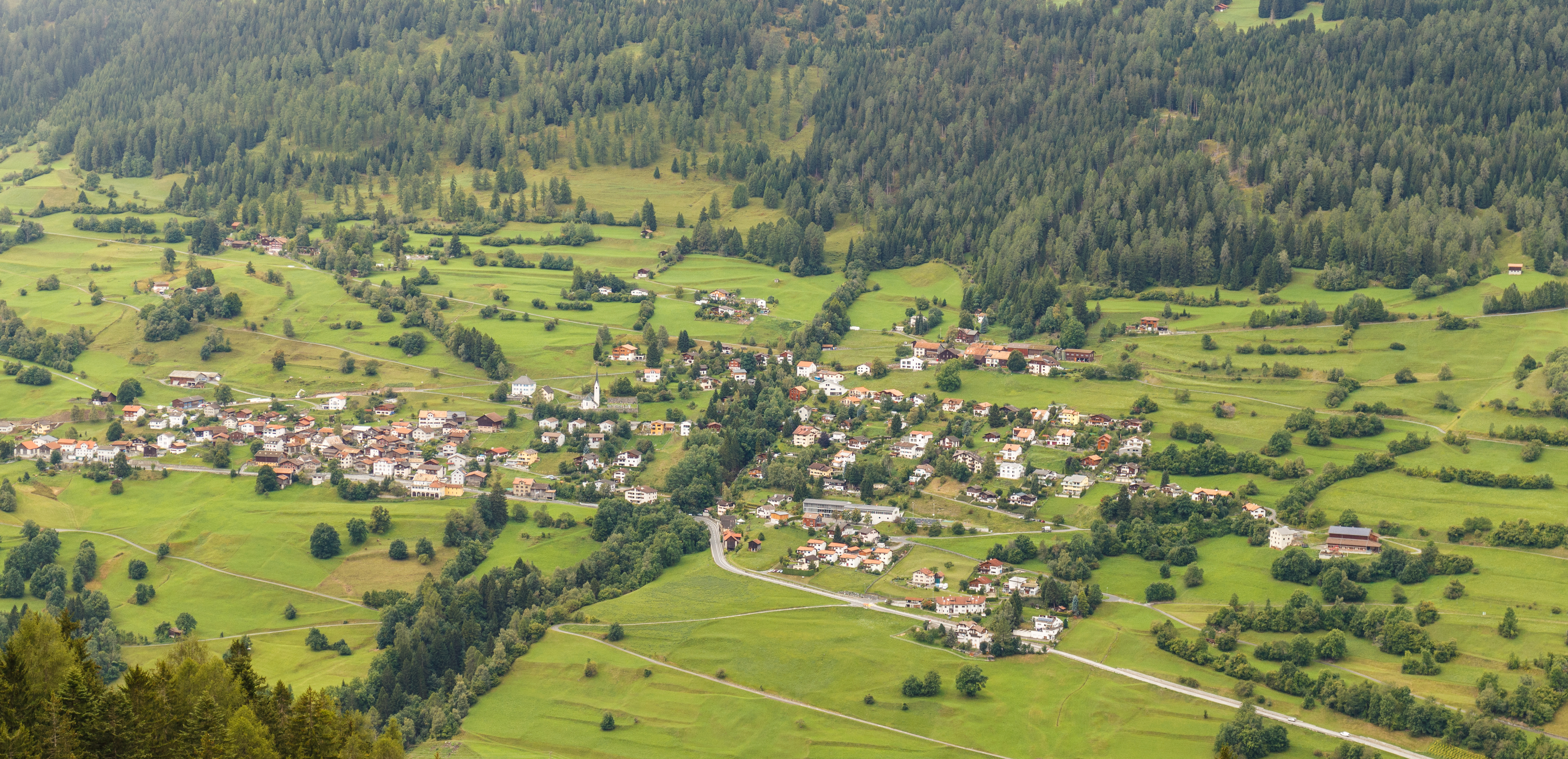

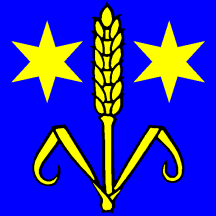
- Flag Coat of arms
- Location of Malix
- Location within Switzerland Location within Canton of Graubünden
- Coordinates: 46°49′N 9°31′E
- Country: Switzerland
- Canton: Graubünden
- District: Plessur

Area
  - Total: 12.60 km^{2} (4.86 sq mi)
- Elevation: 1,116 m (3,661 ft)

Population (December 2008)
  - Total: 709
  - Density: 56.3/km^{2} (146/sq mi)
- Time zone: UTC+01:00 (CET)
  - Summer (DST): UTC+02:00 (CEST)
- Postal code: 7074
- SFOS number: 3912
- ISO 3166 code: CH-GR
- Surrounded by: Churwalden, Chur, Domat/Ems, Scheid
- Website: www.kreis-churwalden.ch/gdemalix

Malix was a municipality in the district of Plessur in the canton of Graubünden in Switzerland. On 1 January 2010 the municipalities of Malix and Parpan merged into the municipality of Churwalden.

== History ==
Malix is first mentioned in 1149 as in Umbilico.

== Geography ==
Aerial view (1954)

Malix has an area, as of 2006, of 12.6 km^{2} (4.9 sq mi). Of this area, 41.9% is used for agricultural purposes, while 46.7% is forested. Of the rest of the land, 4.8% is settled (buildings or roads) and the remainder (6.6%) is non-productive (rivers, glaciers or mountains).

The municipality is located in the Churwalden sub-district of the Plessur district at the entrance to the Churwalden valley. It consists of the haufendorf village (an irregular, unplanned and quite closely packed village, built around a central square)of Malix and the sections of Kreuz and Spina. The municipalities of Malix and Parpan merged on 1 January 2010 into Churwalden.

== Demographics ==
Malix has a population (as of 2008) of 709, of which 11.4% are foreign nationals. Over the last 10 years the population has grown at a rate of 4.3%. Most of the population (as of 2000) speaks German (90.6%), with Romansh being second most common ( 3.6%) and Serbo-Croatian being third ( 2.6%).

As of 2000, the gender distribution of the population was 49.6% male and 50.4% female. The age distribution, as of 2000, in Malix is; 91 children or 13.7% of the population are between 0 and 9 years old. 51 teenagers or 7.7% are 10 to 14, and 35 teenagers or 5.3% are 15 to 19. Of the adult population, 64 people or 9.7% of the population are between 20 and 29 years old. 114 people or 17.2% are 30 to 39, 103 people or 15.5% are 40 to 49, and 77 people or 11.6% are 50 to 59. The senior population distribution is 70 people or 10.6% of the population are between 60 and 69 years old, 33 people or 5.0% are 70 to 79, there are 22 people or 3.3% who are 80 to 89, and there are 3 people or 0.5% who are 90 to 99.

In the 2007 federal election the most popular party was the SVP which received 39.7% of the vote. The next three most popular parties were the SP (30.2%), the FDP (15.7%) and the CVP (12.9%).

The entire Swiss population is generally well educated. In Malix about 80.8% of the population (between age 25–64) have completed either non-mandatory upper secondary education or additional higher education (either University or a Fachhochschule).

Malix has an unemployment rate of 1.96%. As of 2005, there were 26 people employed in the primary economic sector and about 10 businesses involved in this sector. 28 people are employed in the secondary sector and there are 6 businesses in this sector. 74 people are employed in the tertiary sector, with 20 businesses in this sector.

The historical population is given in the following table:

year	population
1623	c. 375
1850	426
1900	340
1950	450
2000	663

== Dreibündenstein ==
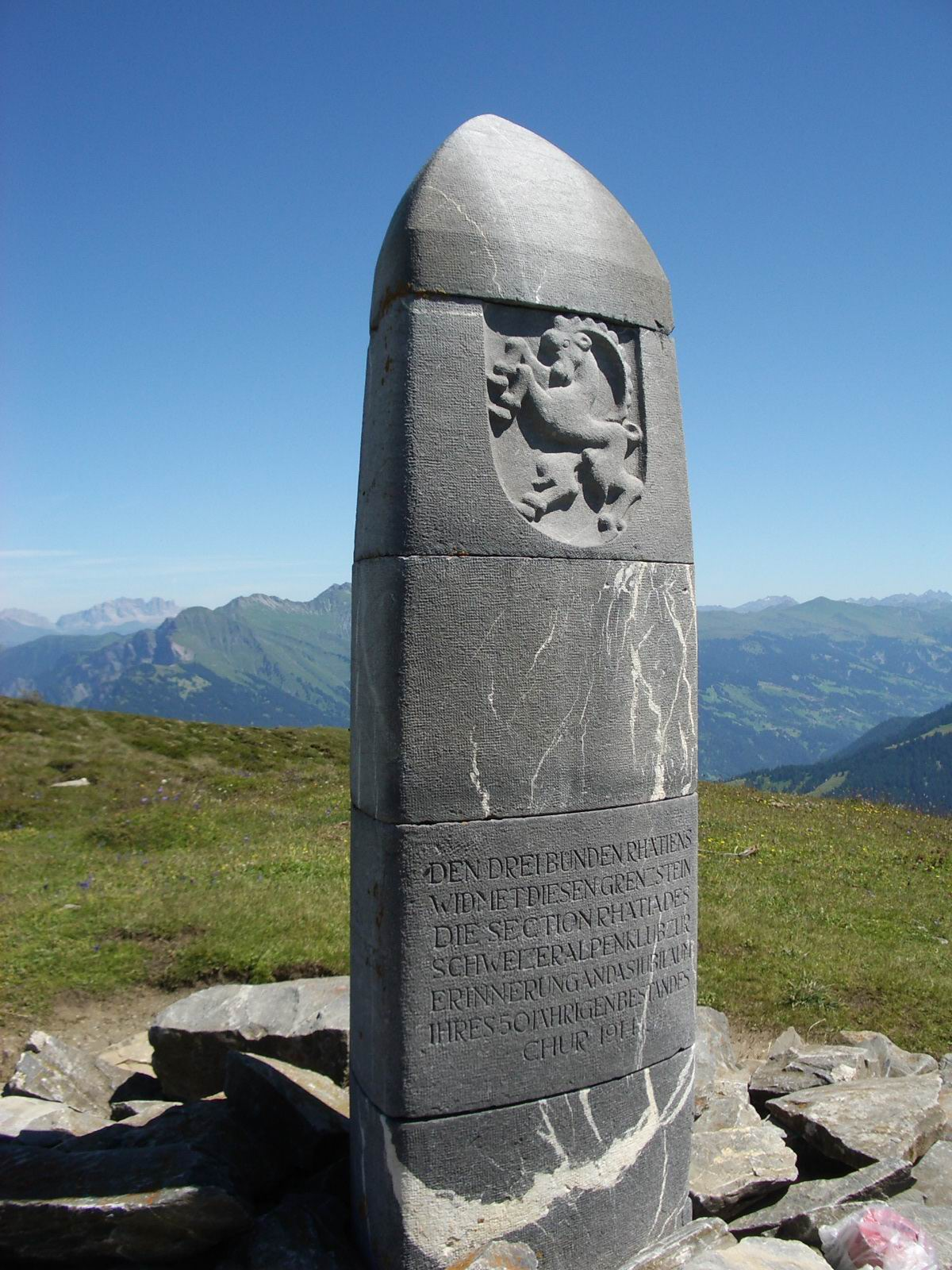
Dreibündenstein, 1915 erected stone to mark the border of the Three Leagues

The Dreibündenstein (Romanish: Term bel) is a marker erected at the intersection of the Three Leagues (League of God's House, the League of the Ten Jurisdictions and the Grey League) which would found the modern canton of Graubünden. The stone is at an altitude of 2,160 m (7,090 ft) on the border between the municipalities of Domat/Ems, Scheid village (now part of Tomils municipality) and Malix. The original stone dates from 1722, and today is in the Rätian Museum in Chur. In 1742, Nicolin Sererhard mentions three stones. The Sektion Rhätia (Rhätian Section) of the Swiss Alpine club built this 2-metre (6 ft 7 in) tall stone marker in 1915. In 1970 a chair lift was added to mountain, making it easier to reach the marker.
