= Locarno Airport =

International Locarno Airport Aeroporto cantonale di Locarno
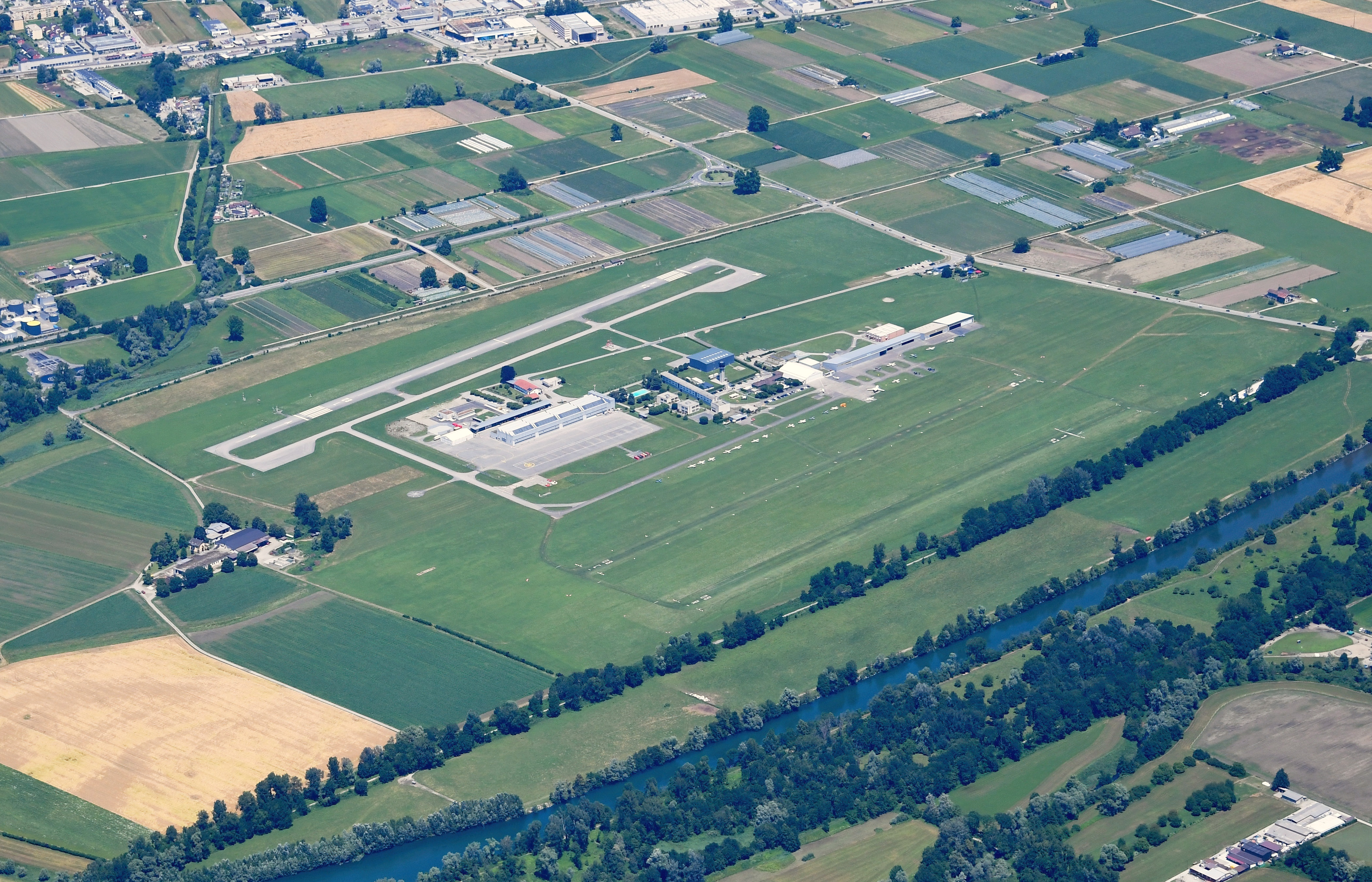
- IATA: QYZ / ZJI; ICAO: LSZL / LSMO

Summary
- Airport type: Public/Military
- Location: Gordola, Ticino, Switzerland
- Elevation AMSL: 198 m (650 ft)
- Coordinates: 46.1653°N 8.8778°E

Map
- Location within Switzerland

Runways
| Direction | Length | | Surface |
| Direction | m | ft | Surface |
|---|---|---|---|
| 08L/26R | 800 | 2,626 | Asphalt |
| 08C/26C | 780 | 2,560 | Grass |
| 08R/26L | 780 | 2,560 | Grass |

International Locarno Airport (Note: Italian: Aeroporto internazionale di Locarno, German: Flugplatz Locarno, French: Aéroport de Locarno) (ICAO: LSZL), mil ICAO code LSMO, also known as Locarno-Magadino Airport, is an airport located near the city of Locarno, Ticino, Switzerland. It is a mixed civilian and military airport. The airfield is used simultaneously by civilian aircraft and the Swiss Air Force from the "airfield command Locarno". Although they use the same runways, the Swiss Air Force has its own taxiways and parking and a large hangar. It is located in the community of Gordola, seven kilometers east of the Locarno city center. The nearest stop to the Swiss Federal Railways is the 2 km distant station Riazzino of railway Giubiasco Locarno.

== History ==
The civilian section of the airport was opened in the summer of 1939. The military section followed the following winter. Since 1941, the Swiss Air Force use it most, because of good weather conditions, for basic flight training of military pilots. At the end of World War II, Swiss authorities identified existing locations that were to be modernized as regional airports, a second tier of infrastructure to support the primary urban airports, with Locarno-Magadino being one of the five.

== Today ==
The facilities consist of one paved runway, two grass runways and one terminal. The airport is accessible by road by the Cantonale Street which connects to Route 13, which leads to a highway which bypasses the city and many interchanges help to get on and off the highway. The airport area itself includes companies such as the helicopter charter company "Eliticino", a partner of Heliswiss, Europe's largest skydive center "Para Centro", the flight school "Aero Locarno", the aircraft maintenance company "Aeromeccanica" and the Rega (air rescue) (Rega Base 6).

The majority of aircraft movements are performed by smaller private aircraft. Most aircraft movements are civilian VFR training flights and training flights by the Swiss Air Force, the helicopter charter company "Eliticino" and the local gliding club, the latter using the two grass runways exclusively. Rega A109 helicopters operate 24h.

In the period from 1999 to 2007, the airfield command spent around 100 million Swiss francs. The infrastructure has been completely renewed. It has a large new hangar with solar power system in which all aircraft are housed, a private, enclosed runway with private taxiway to runway 26R/08L. Furthermore, the new Hangar 5 was established for Armee-Aufklärungsdetachement 10 and Fallschirmaufklärer Kompanie 17.

== Military aircraft ==
The most important Locarno command aircraft stationed at the airfield is the Pilatus PC-7 for completing basic training for aspiring military pilots. At the same time the airfield command Locarno is the unofficial base of the Aerobatics formation PC-7 Team, also the Pilatus PC-6 Turbo-Porter, Pilatus PC-9, Eurocopter EC635, Eurocopter AS532 Cougar, Eurocopter AS332 Super Puma and ADS-95 (RUAG Ranger).

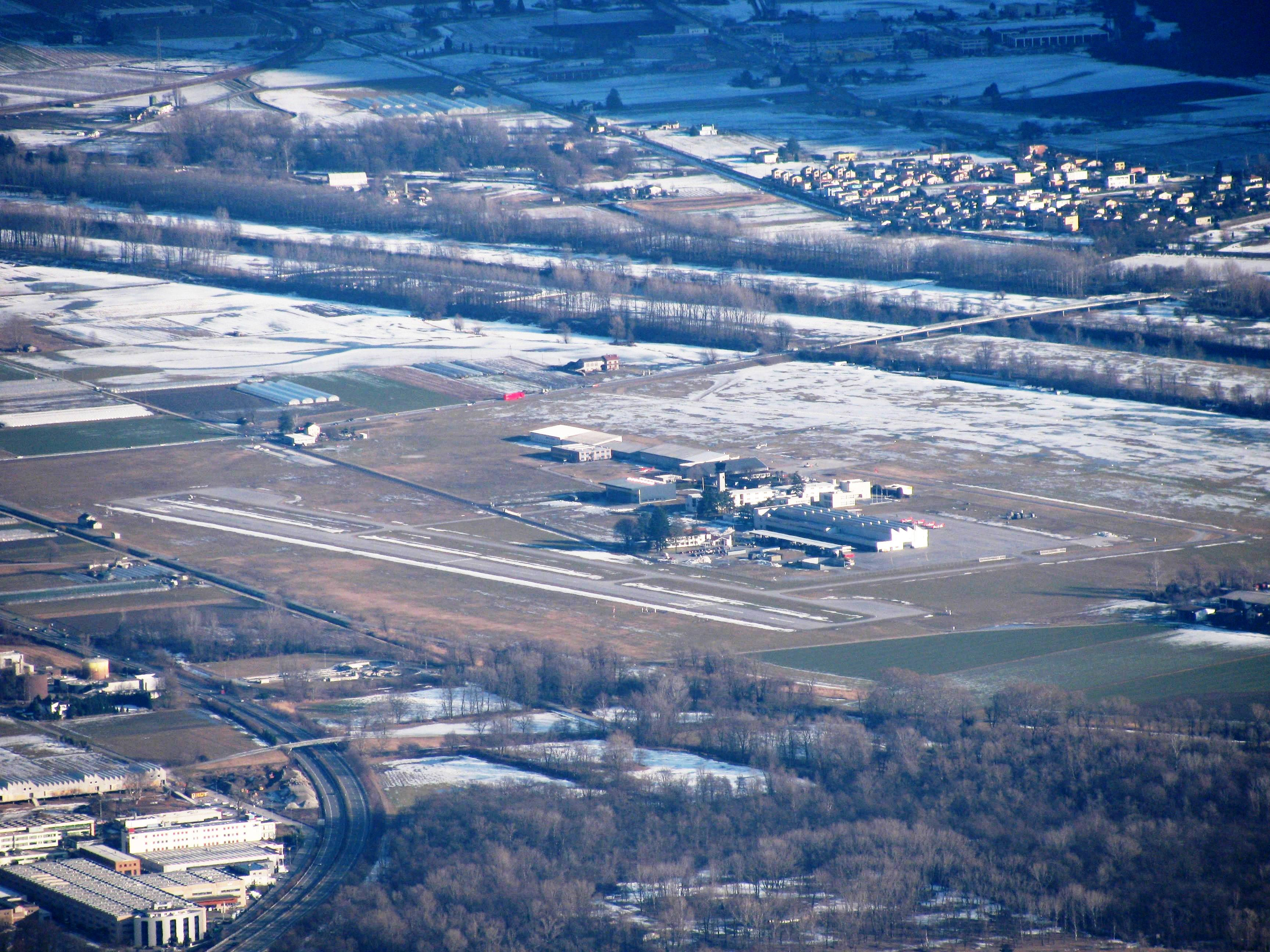
From northwest in winter

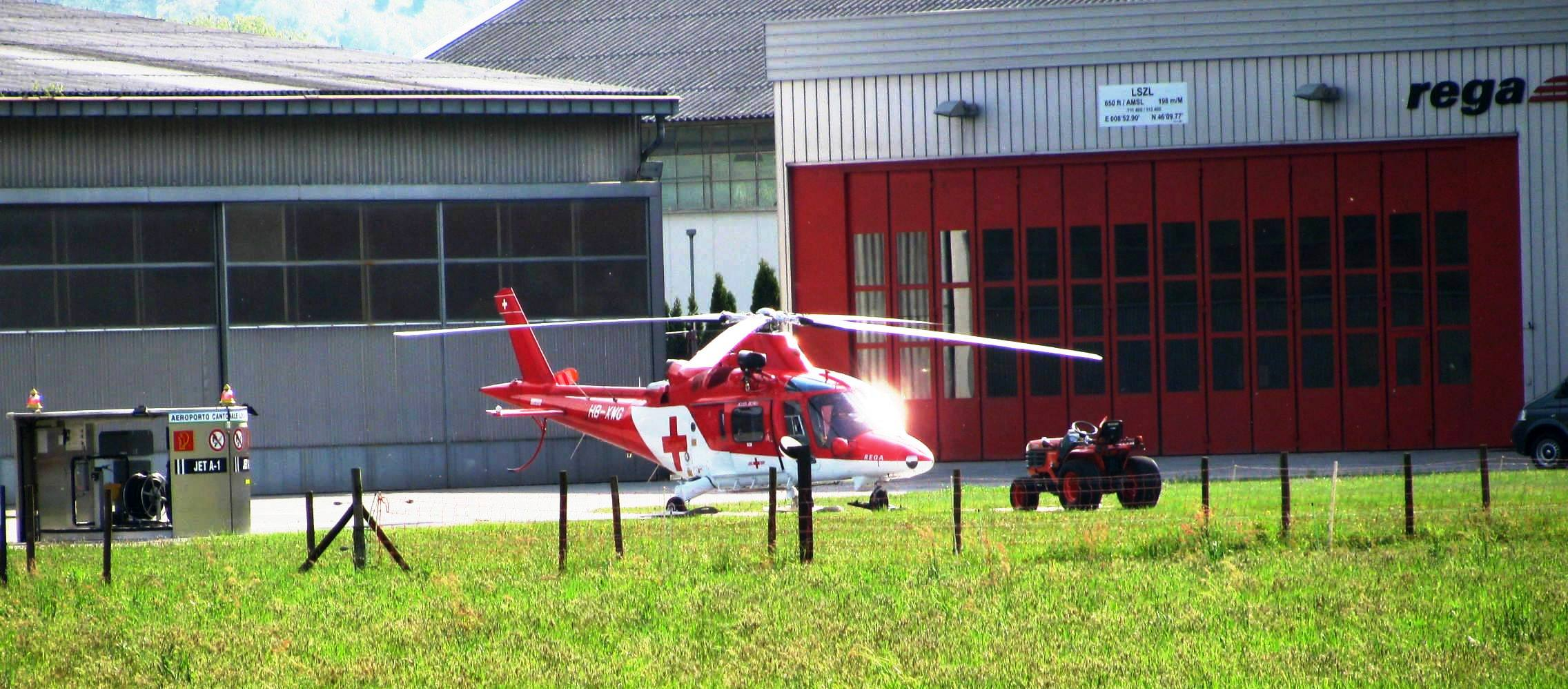
Rega Base 6

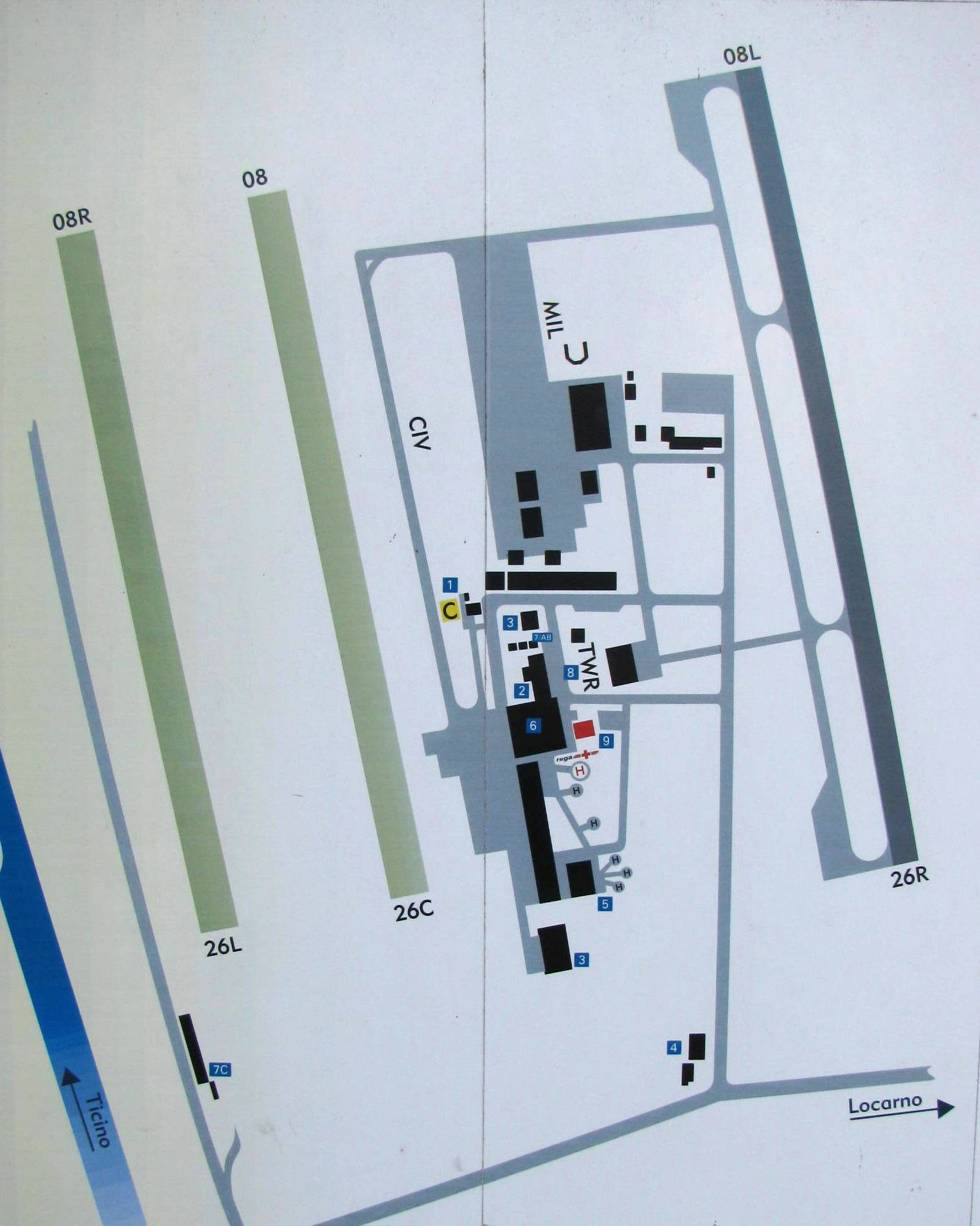
Layoutplan

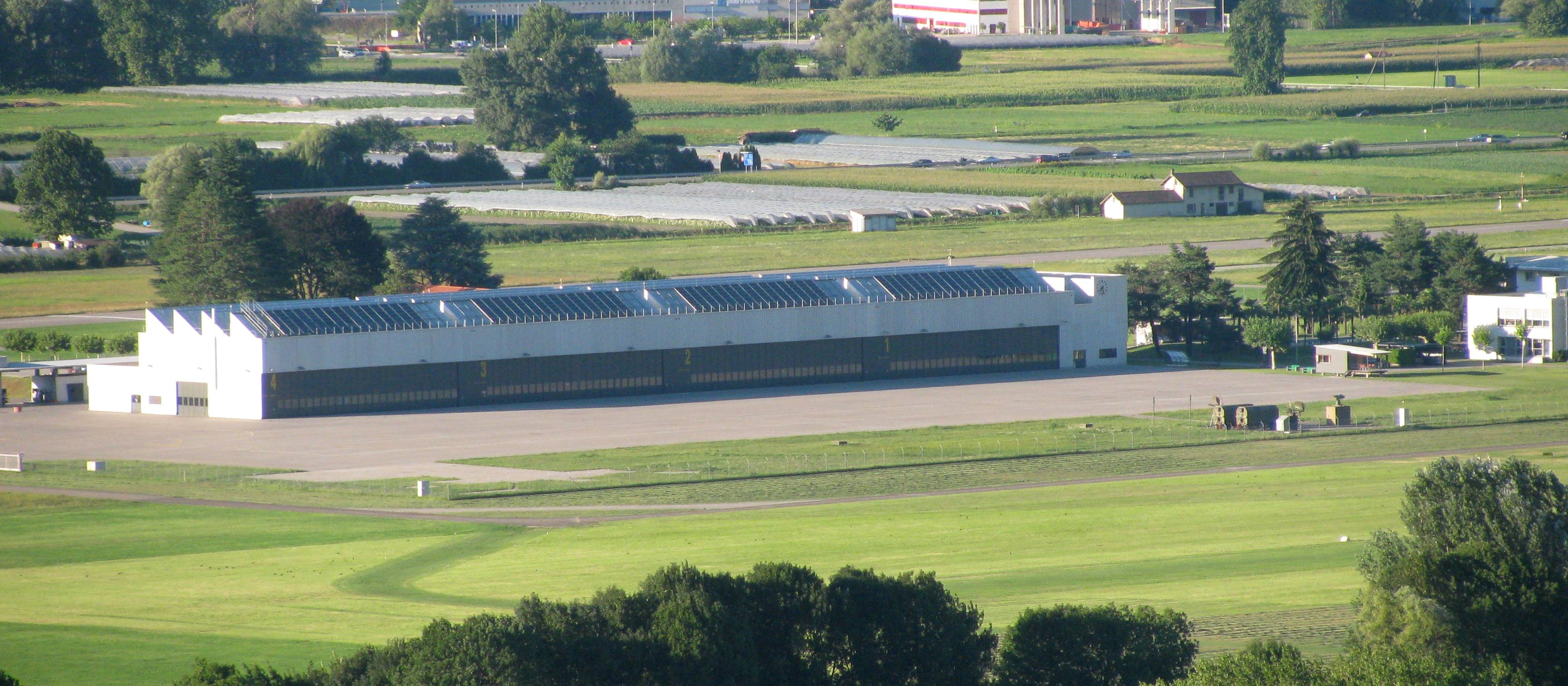
New Hangar

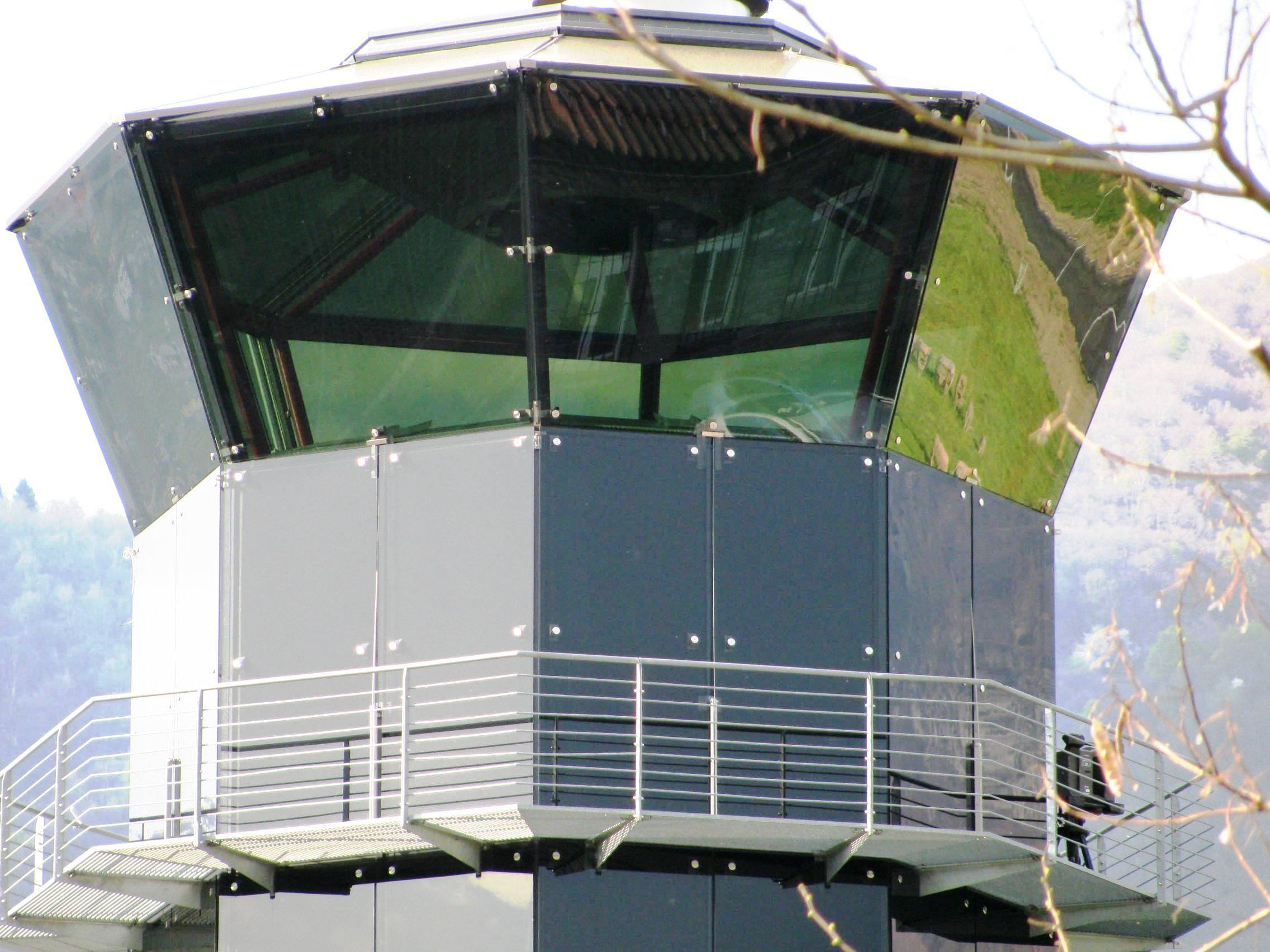
Tower

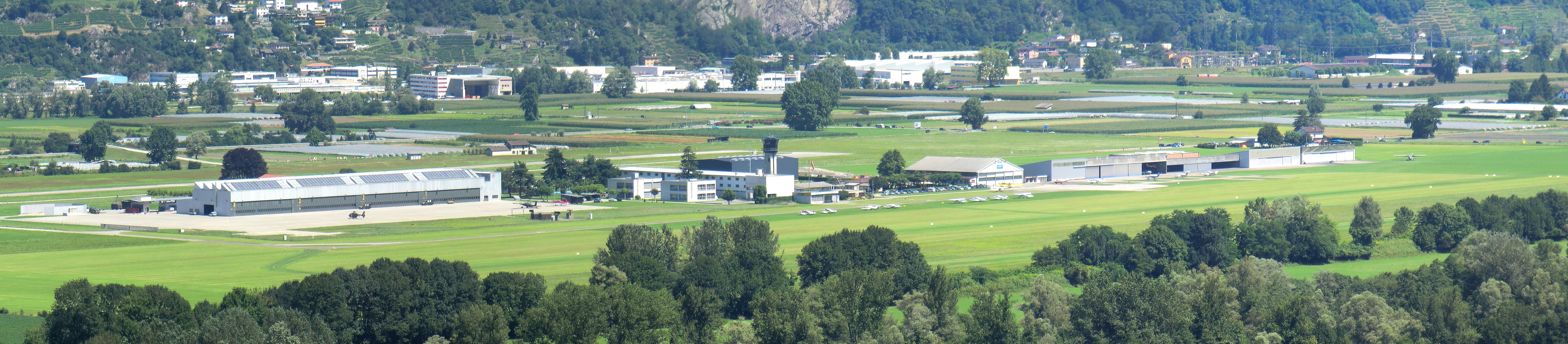
Panoramapicture from southwest

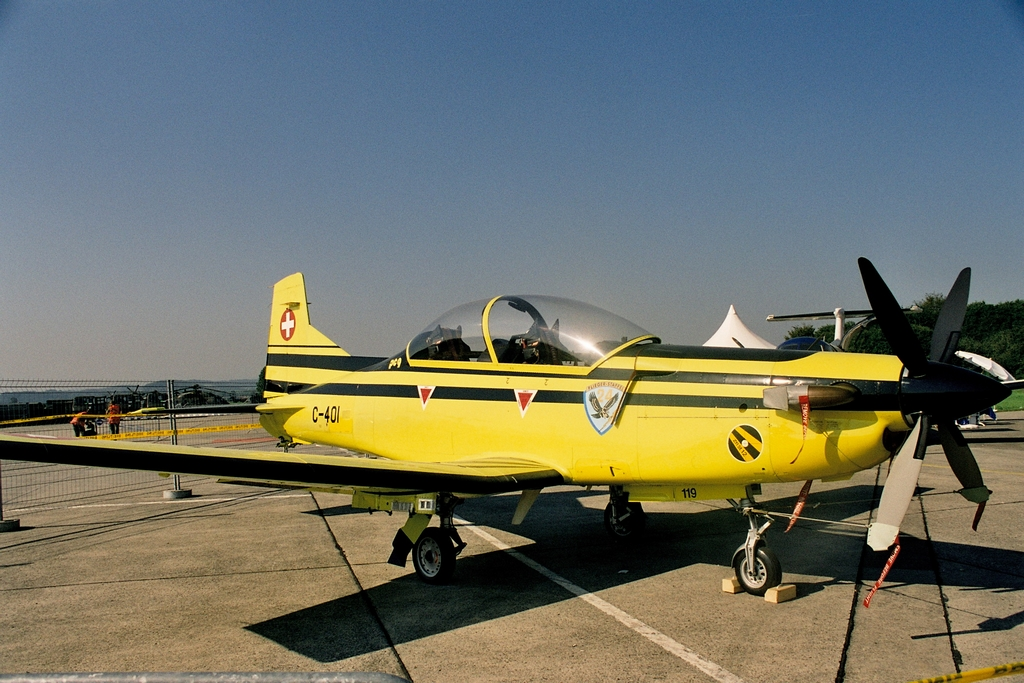
Pilatus PC-9

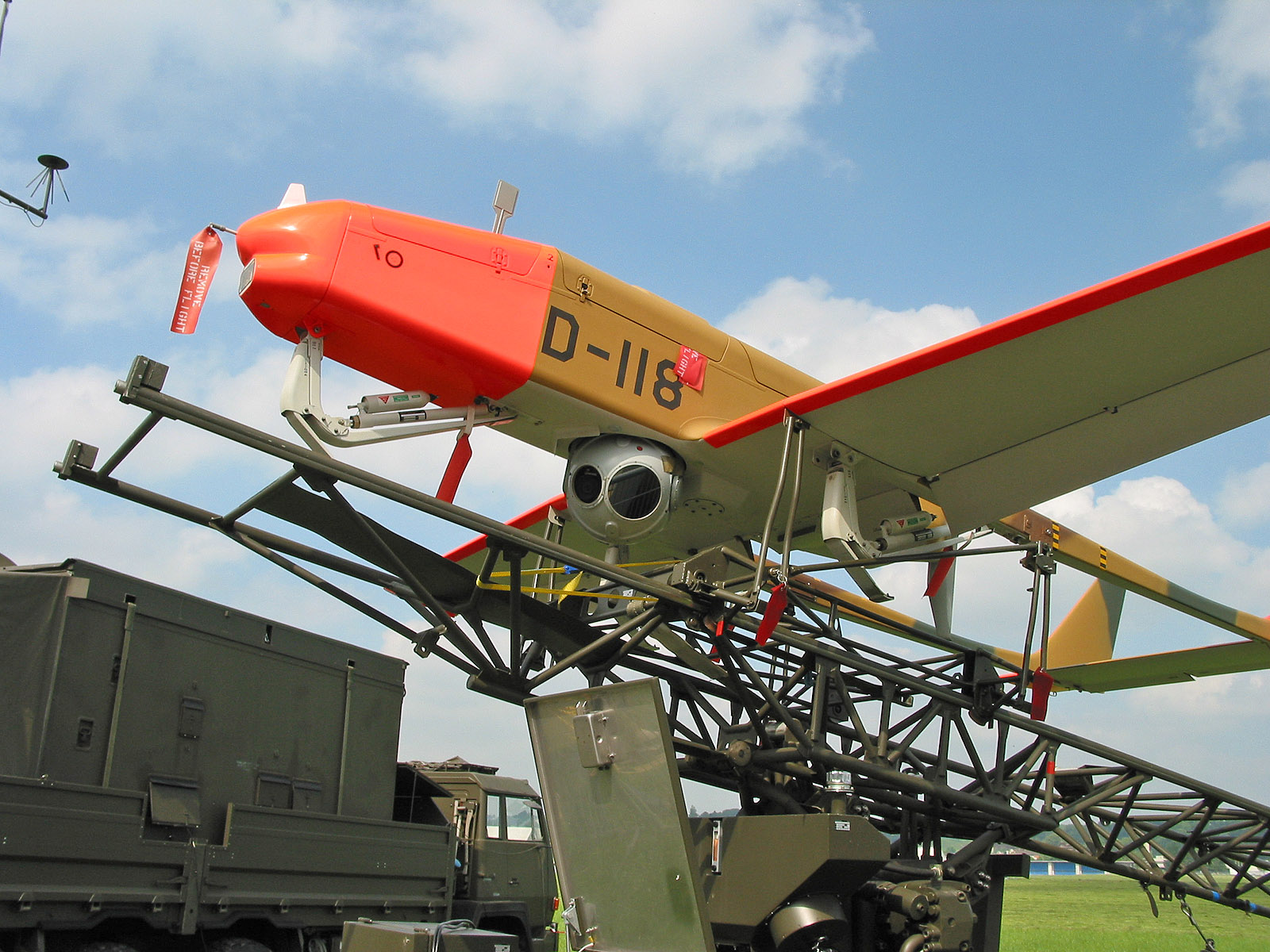
ADS 95

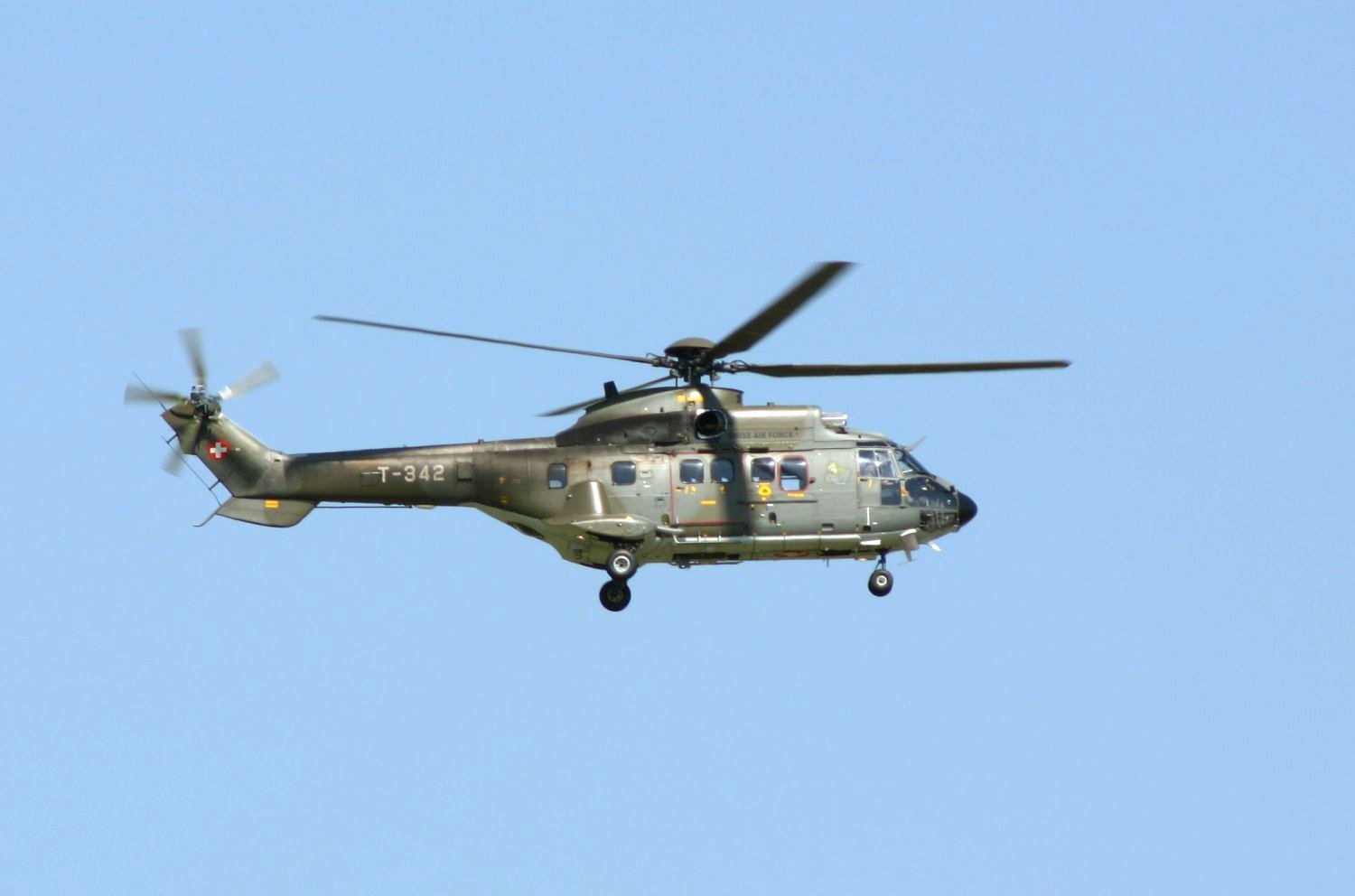
Aérospatiale AS332M1 Super Puma

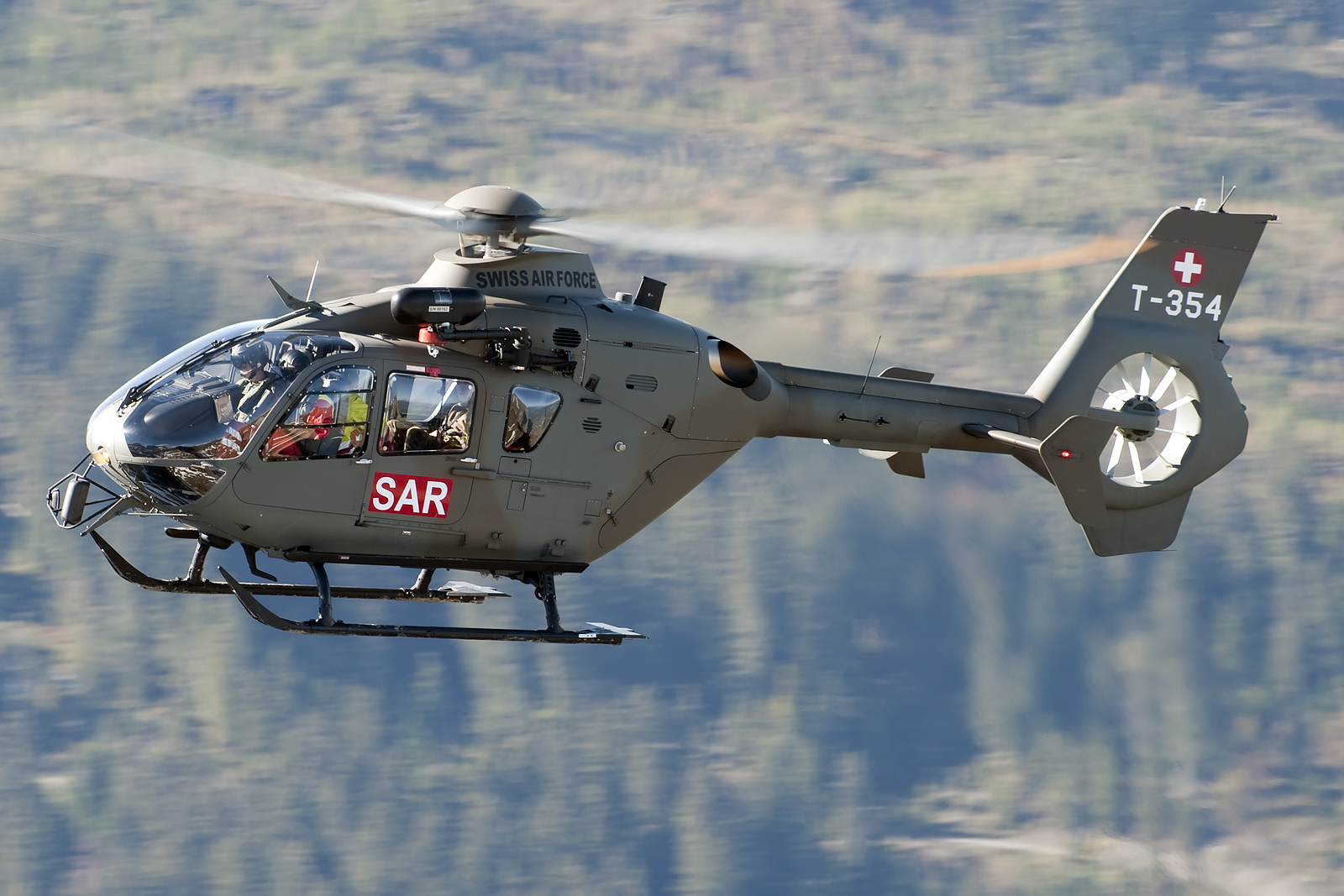
Eurocopter EC 635
