= Liechtensteiner Volksblatt =

Defunct daily newspaper in Liechtenstein

- Front cover of the print edition, 12 February 2021
- Owner: Liechtensteiner Volksblatt AG
- Founder: Johann Franz Fetz
- Founded: 16 August 1878; 147 years ago
- Ceased publication: 4 March 2023; 3 years ago
- Political alignment: Progressive Citizens' Party (formerly)
- Language: German
- Headquarters: Schaan, Liechtenstein
- Country: Liechtenstein
- Website: volksblatt.li (dead link)

The Liechtensteiner Volksblatt was a daily newspaper in Liechtenstein. It was published by the Liechtensteiner Volksblatt AG and peaked with a circulation of 9,000 copies in 2005. The editorial office was located in Schaan. Founded in 1878, the newspaper was considered the party newspaper of the Progressive Citizens' Party (FBP) from 1918 onwards. In March 2023, the newspaper ceased publication due to declining subscriptions and rising costs.

== History ==
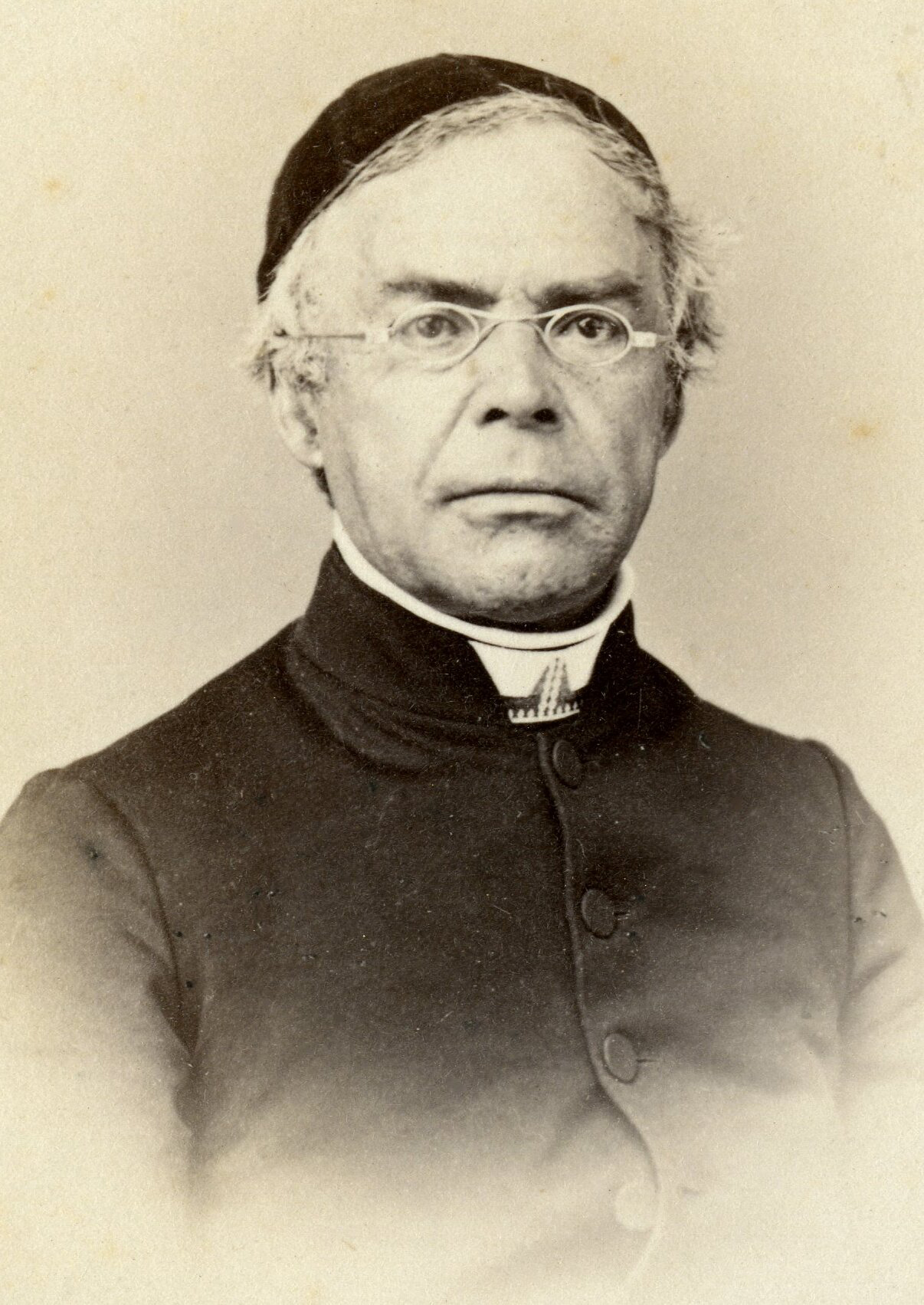
Johann Franz Fetz was the founder and first editor of the Liechtensteiner Volksblatt

The newspaper was founded by priest and historian Johann Franz Fetz, with its first publication on 16 August 1878. It was the third attempt to establish an independent newspaper in Liechtenstein, behind the Liechtensteinischen Landeszeitung and Liechtensteinische Wochenzeitung. The newspaper was ideologically Catholic conservative, but had no political agenda. From 1894 to 1895, a dispute between the Landtag of Liechtenstein and governor Friedrich Stellwag von Carion arose regarding the Landtag's powers, which resulted in a temporary censorship of the newspaper.

The Volksblatt was the only newspaper in Liechtenstein until 1914 when Oberrheinische Nachrichten (later Liechtensteiner Nachrichten and then Liechtensteiner Vaterland from 1936), which became the official newspaper of the Christian-Social People's Party and later Patriotic Union (VU). Similarly, the Volksblatt became the newspaper of the Progressive Citizens' Party (FBP) upon its formation in 1918. From the 1930s, the media landscape in Liechtenstein was dominated by the "black" Volksblatt and "red" Vaterland.

Up until 1918, it was published as a weekly newspaper, until it began printing twice weekly from January 1919. The company gradually increased its rate of publication, from three editions per week starting in July 1927, expanding to four in January 1962, and then five times a week in January 1978. From January 1985, the paper was printed every day, except Sunday. From 1918, the newspaper was published by the Press Association of the FBP, then the Liechtensteiner Volksblatt Publishing House from 1932 to 2006, and finally by the Liechtensteiner Volksblatt AG from 2006 to 2023. It launched its own website in 2000. The newspaper was primarily financed through subscriptions, state funding, and the sale of advertisements.

The Volksblatt was the most circulated newspaper in Liechtenstein until the 1970s, and peaked at 9,000 in 2005; from there circulation steadily declined to 4,000 in 2022. Due to financial difficulties, the FBP proposed a motion in the Landtag of Liechtenstein to grant the newspaper additional state-funding for three years. However, in February 2023, Christine Wohlwend, the president of the board of directors, announced that the newspaper would cease publication the following month due to declining subscriptions and rising costs; the FBP subsequently withdrew its proposal. As part of the shutdown, all subscribers automatically became subscribers to the Vaterland. The Vaterland also announced its distancing from the VU and a move towards a politically neutral stance in response to the Volksblatt's closure.
