= Domat/Ems =

- Municipality
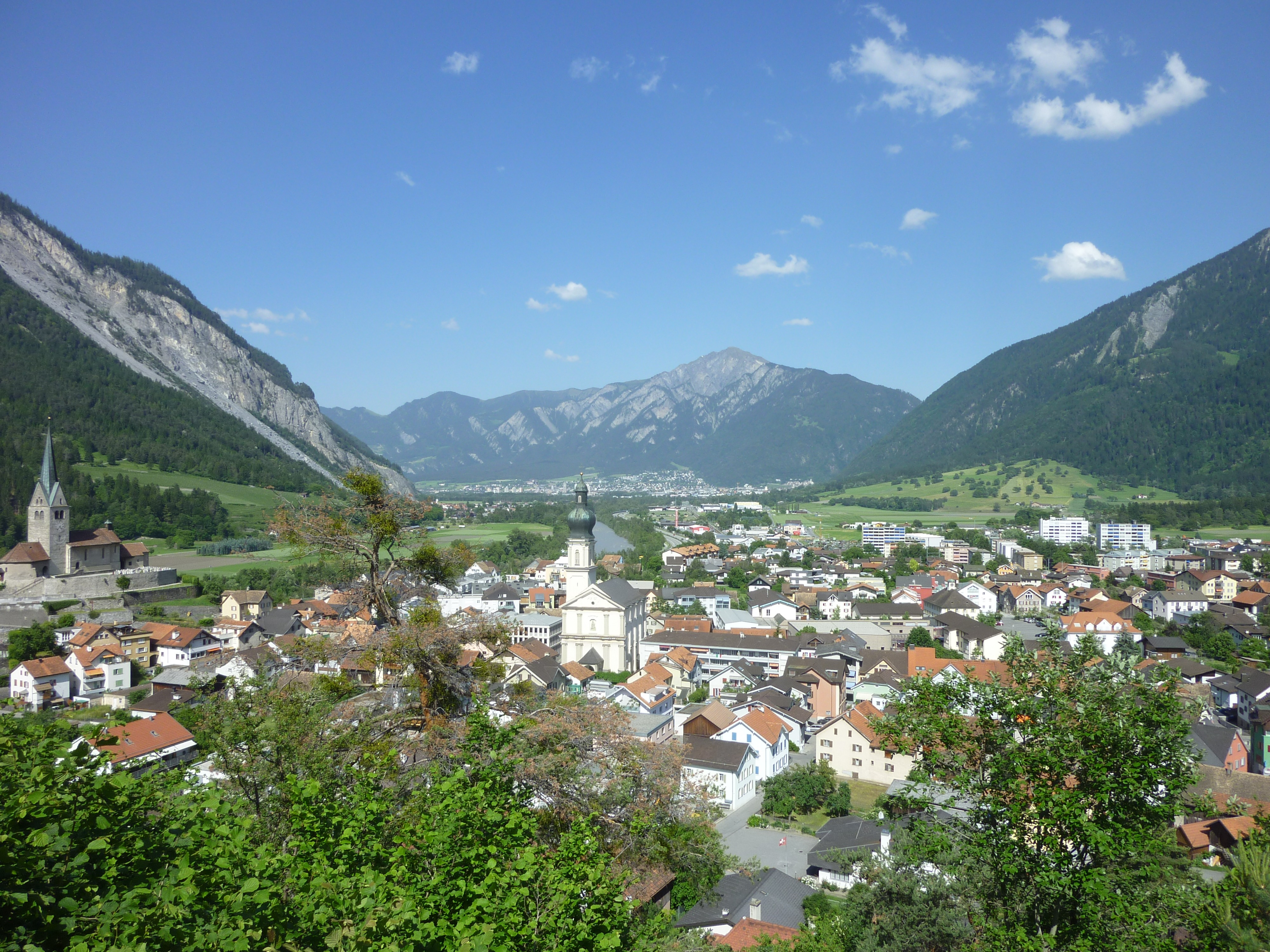

- Flag Coat of arms
- Location of Domat/Ems
- Location within Switzerland Location within Canton of Grisons
- Coordinates: 46°50′N 9°27′E
- Country: Switzerland
- Canton: Grisons
- District: Imboden

Area
  - Total: 24.24 km^{2} (9.36 sq mi)
- Elevation: 586 m (1,923 ft)

Population (December 2020)
  - Total: 8,161
  - Density: 336.7/km^{2} (872.0/sq mi)
- Time zone: UTC+01:00 (CET)
  - Summer (DST): UTC+02:00 (CEST)
- Postal code: 7013
- SFOS number: 3722
- ISO 3166 code: CH-GR
- Surrounded by: Bonaduz, Chur, Feldis/Veulden, Felsberg, Malix, Rhäzüns, Rothenbrunnen, Scheid, Tamins
- Website: www.domat-ems.ch

Domat/Ems (Romansh: Domat [ˈdomɐt]; German: Ems) is a municipality in the Imboden Region in the Swiss canton of the Grisons.

== History ==
Aerial view from 400 m by Walter Mittelholzer (1925)

Domat/Ems is first mentioned in 765 as colonia de Amede. Ems is the German name for the municipality, Domat is the Romansh name and since 1943 the official name has been the combination of both.

== Geography ==
Domat/Ems has an area, as of 2006, of 24.2 km^{2} (9.3 sq mi). Of this area, 27.7% is used for agricultural purposes, while 53.8% is forested. Of the rest of the land, 12.2% is settled (buildings or roads) and the remainder (6.4%) is non-productive (rivers, glaciers or mountains).

Before 2017, the municipality was located in the Rhäzüns sub-district, of the Imboden district, after 2017 it was part of the Imboden Region. It is located on the right bank of the Rhine river. Until 1943 Domat/Ems was known as Ems.

== Demographics ==
Domat/Ems has a population (as of 31 December 2020) of 8,161. As of 2008, 18.5% of the population was made up of foreign nationals. Over the last 10 years the population has grown at a rate of 7.2%.

As of 2000, the gender distribution of the population was 49.4% male and 50.6% female. The age distribution, as of 2000, in Domat/Ems is; 675 people or 10.6% of the population are between 0 and 9 years old. 394 people or 6.2% are 10 to 14, and 432 people or 6.8% are 15 to 19. Of the adult population, 819 people or 12.9% of the population are between 20 and 29 years old. 977 people or 15.3% are 30 to 39, 1,005 people or 15.8% are 40 to 49, and 888 people or 13.9% are 50 to 59. The senior population distribution is 599 people or 9.4% of the population are between 60 and 69 years old, 376 people or 5.9% are 70 to 79, there are 180 people or 2.8% who are 80 to 89, and there are 27 people or 0.4% who are 90 to 99.

In the 2007 federal election the most popular party was the SVP which received 33.3% of the vote. The next three most popular parties were the CVP (28.7%), the SPS (22.7%) and the FDP (12.4%).

The entire Swiss population is generally well educated. In Domat/Ems about 68.9% of the population (between age 25–64) have completed either non-mandatory upper secondary education or additional higher education (either university or a Fachhochschule).

Domat/Ems has an unemployment rate of 1.55%. As of 2005, there were 108 people employed in the primary economic sector and about 21 businesses involved in this sector. 1,782 people are employed in the secondary sector and there are 55 businesses in this sector. 895 people are employed in the tertiary sector, with 150 businesses in this sector.

From the 2000 census, 4,061 or 63.7% are Roman Catholic, while 1,285 or 20.2% belonged to the Swiss Reformed Church. Of the rest of the population, there are 167 individuals (or about 2.62% of the population) who belong to the Orthodox Church, and there are 54 individuals (or about 0.85% of the population) who belong to another Christian church. There are 305 (or about 4.79% of the population) who are Islamic. There are 78 individuals (or about 1.22% of the population) who belong to another church (not listed on the census), 222 (or about 3.48% of the population) belong to no church, are agnostic or atheist, and 200 individuals (or about 3.14% of the population) did not answer the question.

The historical population is given in the following table:

year	population
1850	1,247
1900	1,504
1941	1,955
1960	3,469
1970	5,701
1990	6,442
2000	6,372

== Economy ==
Domat/Ems is home to the headquarters and chemical plant of the Ems-Chemie company, named after the town of Ems.

== Languages ==
Most of the population (as of 2000) speaks German (73.3%), with Romansh being second most common (11.0%) and Italian being third ( 7.4%).

Languages in Domat/Ems GR
Languages	Census 1980		Census 1990		Census 2000	
Languages	Number	Percent	Number	Percent	Number	Percent
German	3450	55.06%	4403	68.35%	4670	73.29%
Romansh	1846	29.46%	1016	15.77%	704	11.05%
Italian	766	12.22%	629	9.76%	471	7.39%
Population	6266	100%	6442	100%	6372	100%

== Sights ==
=== Dreibündenstein ===
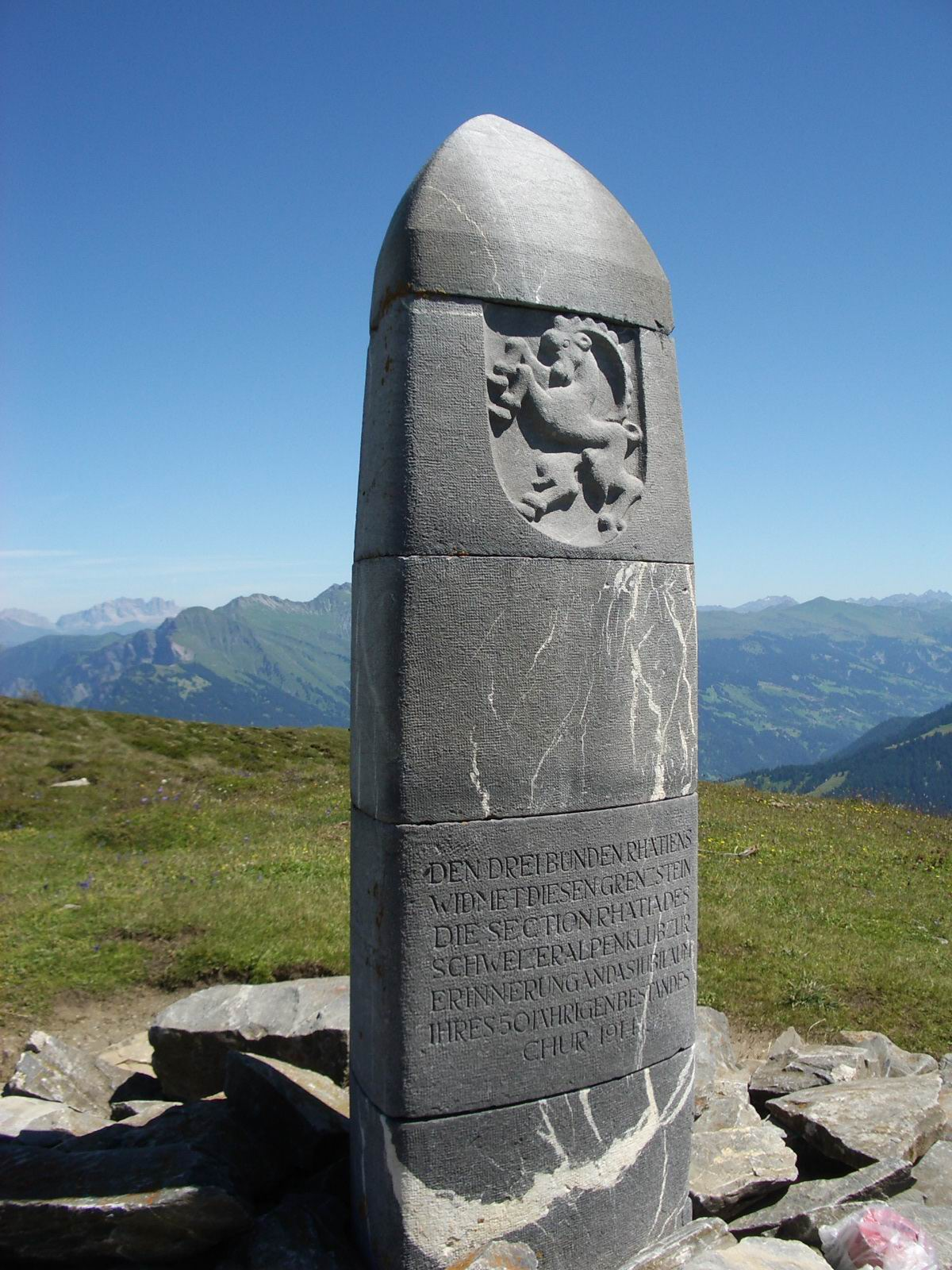
Dreibündenstein, 1915 erected stone to mark the border of the Three Leagues

The Dreibündenstein (Romanish: Term bel) is a marker erected at the intersection of the Three Leagues (League of God's House, the League of the Ten Jurisdictions and the Grey League) which would found the modern canton of Grisons. The stone is at an altitude of 2,160 m (7,090 ft) on the border between the municipalities of Domat/Ems, Scheid village (now part of Tomils municipality) and Malix. The original stone dates from 1722, and today is in the Rätian Museum in Chur. In 1742, Nicolin Sererhard mentions three stones. The Sektion Rhätia (Rhätian Section) of the Swiss Alpine club built this 2-metre (6 ft 7 in) tall stone marker in 1915. In 1970 a chair lift was added to mountain, making it easier to reach the marker.

=== Heritage sites of national significance ===
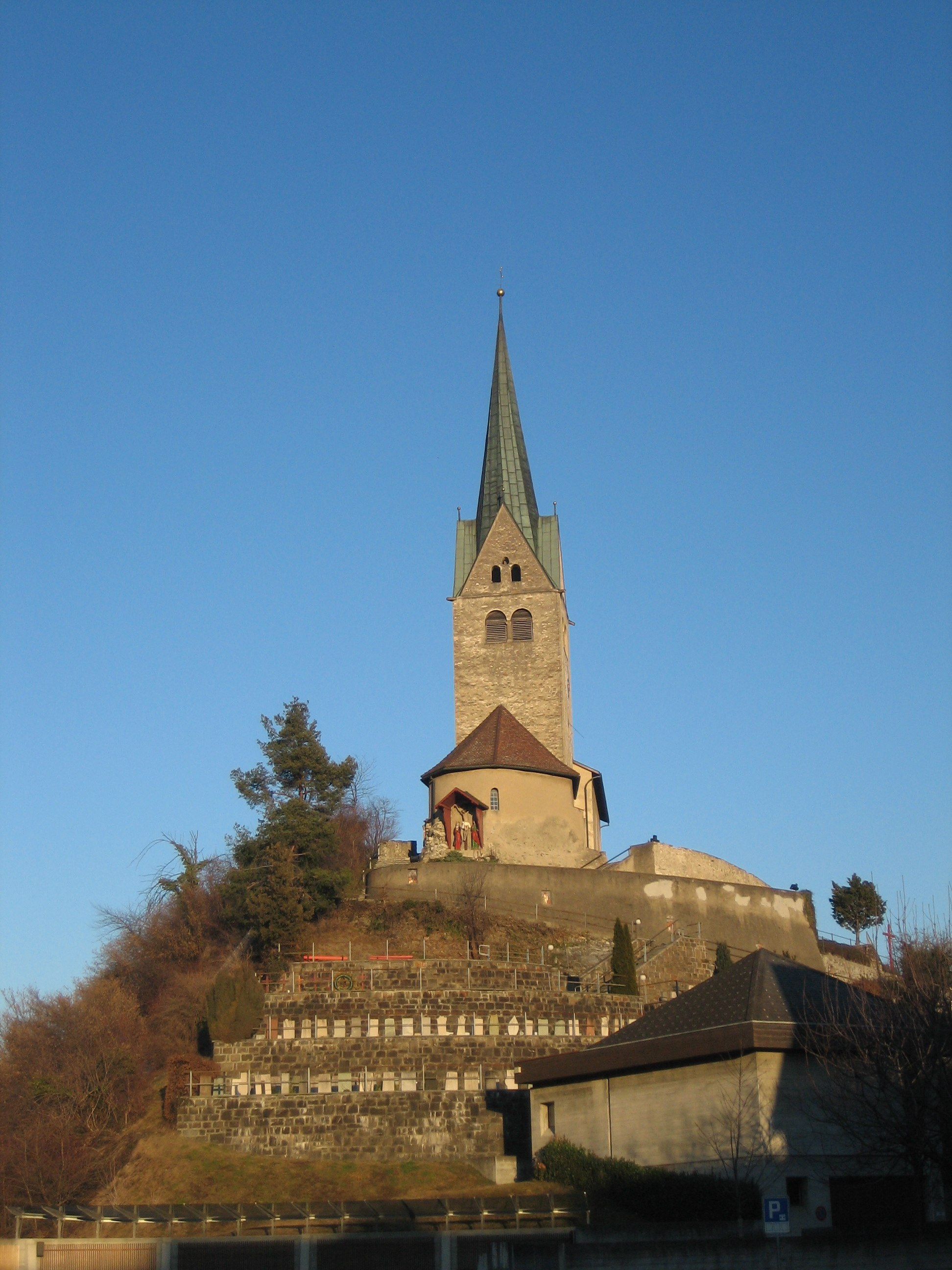
Baselgia S. Gion Baptista/Church of St. John the Baptist

The Baselgia S. Gion Baptista/Church of St. John the Baptist and the Chaplutta S. Peder/Church of St. Peter are listed as Swiss heritage sites of national significance.

The parish church of S. Gion Baptista/St. John the Baptist was built on the Tuma Turera tower. This large guard tower was integrated into the church from the initial construction. In the early 16th Century it was rebuilt in a late gothic style and the extensive wood carvings of the polyptych altars were added at that time.

The Chaplutta S. Pieder/St. Peter was built around 800 in a Carolingian style. It was built on the foundation of a 7th-8th Century church, on the east side of the Tuma Casti tower.

=== Apartment building Fravi ===
The Fravi apartment building was built between 2005 and 2016 according to plans by Raphael Zuber and civil engineer Patrick Gartmann. Contributors were Takaaki Murakami and David Gianinazzi. Photographed by Javier Miguel Verme. It was shown at the Venice Biennale of Architecture in 2016.

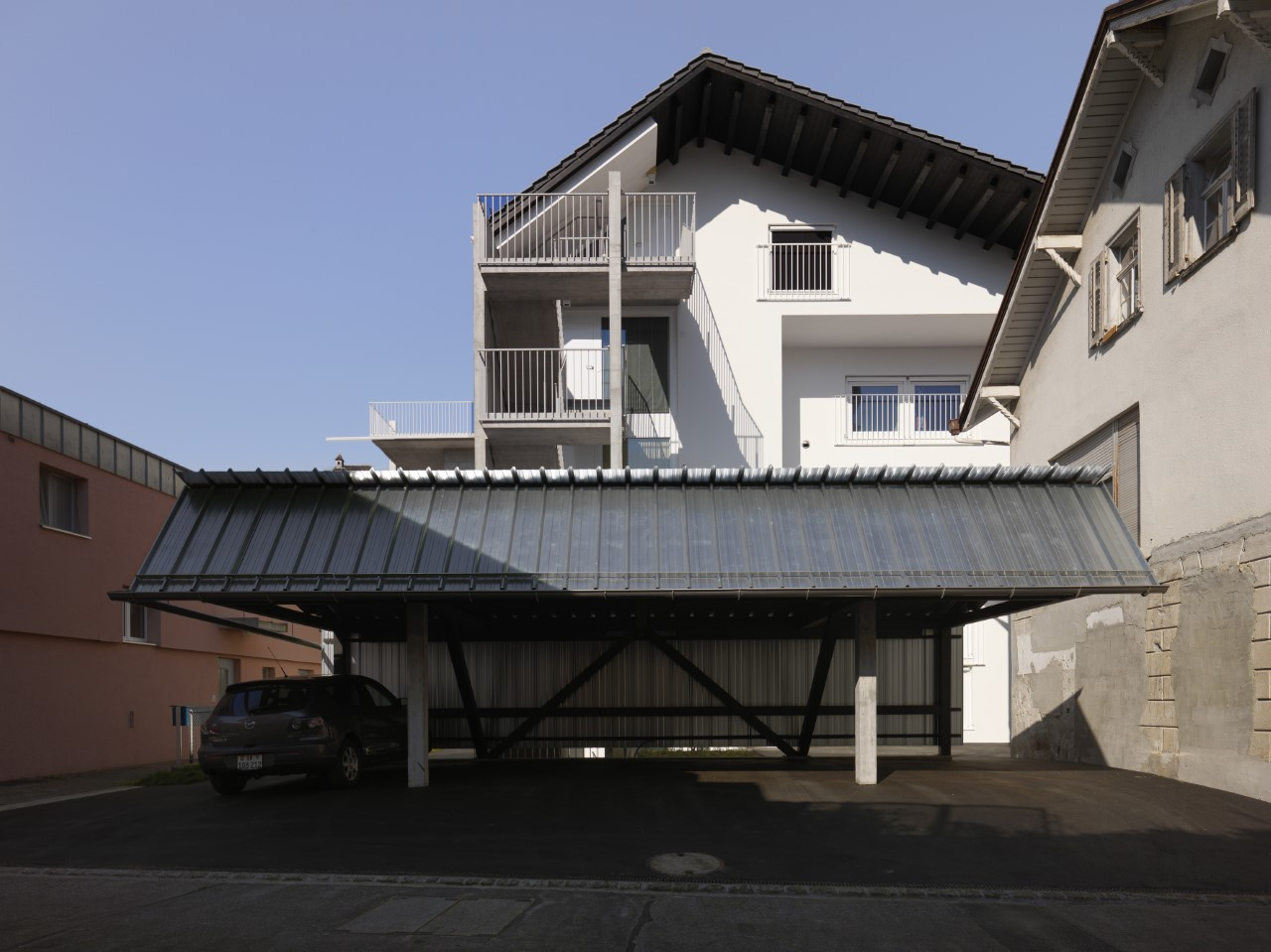
Apartment building

== Transportation ==
The municipality has four railway stations: Domat/Ems, Ems Werk, Reichenau-Tamins, and Felsberg. The last two are located at the borders of Reichenau and Felsberg respectively, serving these municipalities. All four are located on the Landquart–Thusis line; Reichenau-Tamins is the junction of that line with the Reichenau-Tamins–Disentis/Mustér line. Between them there is regular service to Disentis/Mustér, Scuol-Tarasp, Chur, and St. Moritz.

== Notable people ==
- Johann Franz Fetz (1809–1884), priest, born in Domat/Ems
