= Churwalden Abbey =

Former Premonstratensian abbey in Switzerland

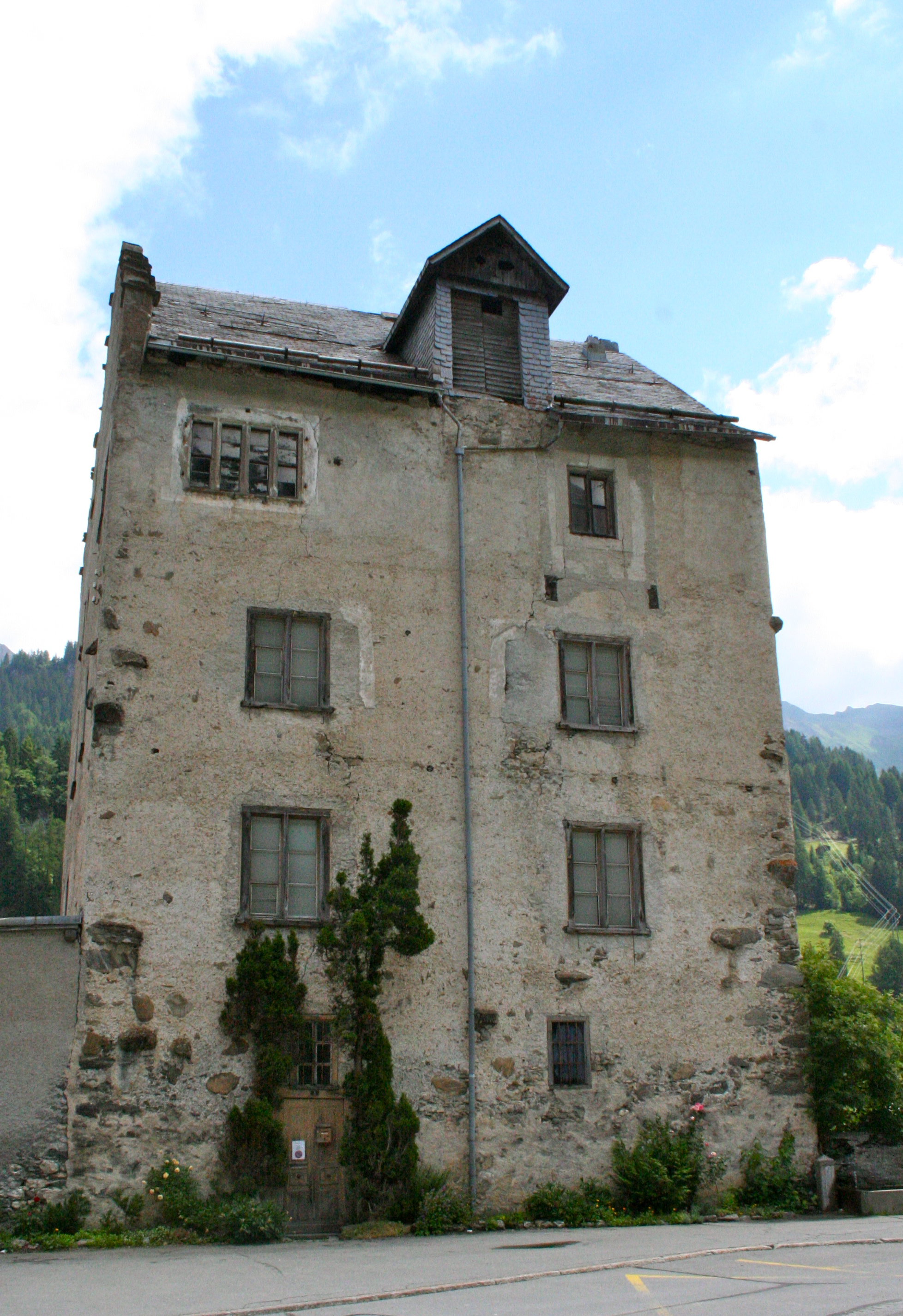
- The Abbot's tower of Churwalden Abbey

- Location within Canton of Graubünden Location within Switzerland
- Interactive map of Churwalden Abbey

Monastery information
- Order: Premonstratensians
- Established: around 1150
- Mother house: Roggenburg Abbey
- Dedication: Maria and Michael

People
- Founder: Freiherr von Vaz

Site
- Location: Churwalden, Canton of Graubünden, Switzerland
- Coordinates: 46°47′19.4″N 9°32′10.2″E

Churwalden Abbey is a former Premonstratensian abbey in the municipality of Churwalden, Canton of Graubünden, Switzerland. It was founded around 1150, abandoned after the Protestant Reformation and was formally dissolved in July 1803. It is a Swiss heritage sites of national significance.

== History ==
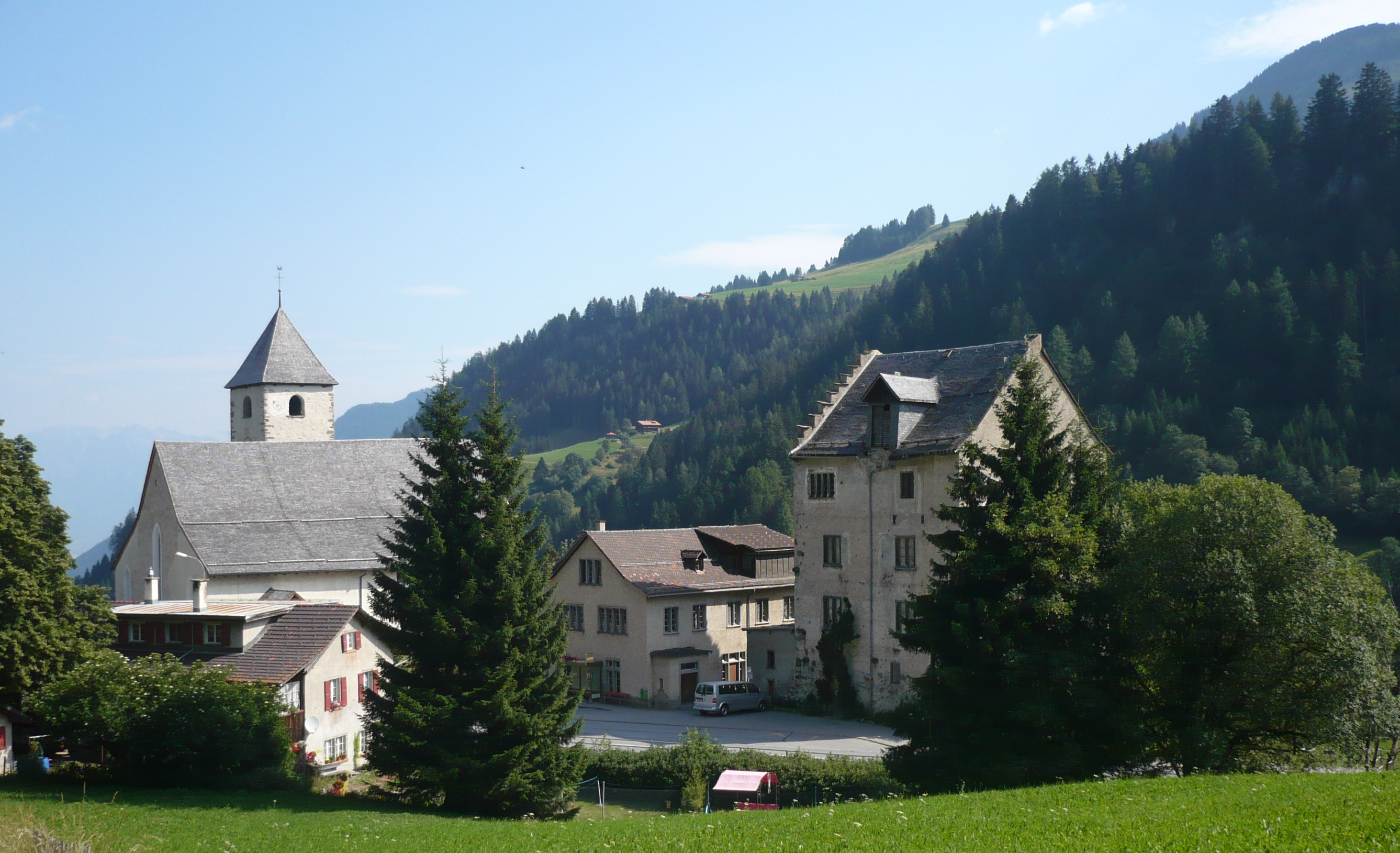
Church of St. Maria and Michael and the Abbot's tower

The abbey was founded under a provost around 1150 or 1164 by the Freiherr von Vaz. The abbey church of Saint Mary already stood on the site and was first mentioned in 1149 as S. Maria in silva Augeria. The vogt over the abbey lived in the nearby Strassberg Castle. Soon after its founding, in addition to the Permonstratensian canons regular, Augustinian nuns were living at the monastery. In 1208 an uprising of the lay brothers drove the provost and his supporters out of Churwalden. They eventually settled in Rüti Abbey in Rüti in the canton of Zürich. The monastery stood along one of the main trade roads over the alpine passes of Graubünden and became a resting place and hospital for travelers. By 1210 the hospital had its own chapel.

During the mid-13th century the Church of St. Michael (later St. Maria and Michael) was built about 250 m (820 ft) north of the abbey church. A fire around 1400 destroyed much of the monastery complex and over the following years it was gradually rebuilt. In 1446 it was raised from a monastery to an abbey. At some point during the 14th or 15th centuries the provost or abbot began building a comfortable tower house about 100 m (330 ft) south of the abbey church. The tower is four stories and an attic tall and was renovated multiple times over the following centuries. In 1472 it was partially gutted in a fire and the upper two stories were rebuilt in the early 16th century. The 1472 fire also destroyed the Church of St. Michael, which was rebuilt in the Gothic style and consecrated in 1502.

In the early 16th century the Protestant Reformation spread into the region and in 1527 was adopted partially adopted in Churwalden. A Protestant vogt was appointed over the abbey, abbey lands were confiscated and the monastery was forbidden to accept novices. In 1533 there was only one monk and the abbot still at Churwalden. In 1599, the previous abbot was not replaced and the remaining abbey lands were administered from Roggenburg. In 1616 the court in Churwalden declared that the church would have to be used for both catholic and Protestant services. In 1803 Roggenburg Abbey was closed and the remaining Churwalden lands were transferred to the seminary at St. Luzi. With this transfer, the abbey was formally dissolved. After 1599 the abbey buildings slowly fell into ruin and were eventually demolished, leaving only the abbot's tower and the Church of St. Maria and Michael.

== Abbot's tower ==
The abbot's tower was built around the mid-15th century and rebuilt in the 16th century. The interior was renovated in 1870. Inside traces of late-Gothic murals are still visible, along with Renaissance wooden panels in the abbot's sitting room.

== Church of St. Maria and Michael ==
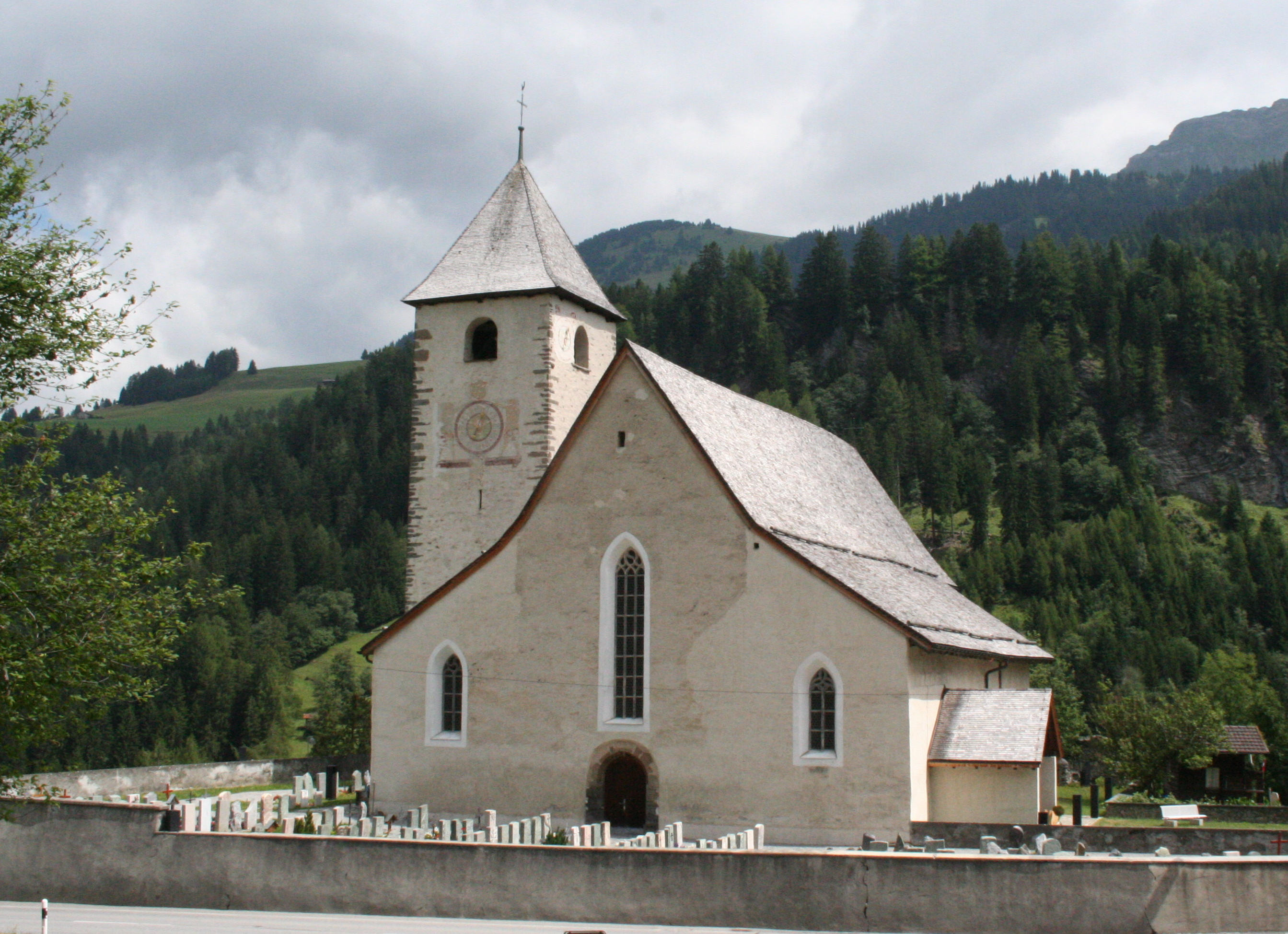
Exterior of the church

The original church on the site was the Romanesque Church of St. Michael, which was destroyed in a fire in 1472. It was rebuilt from 1477 until 1502 in the Gothic style. The current church is a three-apse building with a choir that spans the entire width. The bell tower is located on the north side of the building. The unplastered tower was built between 1250 and 1340 and renovated in 1511. The west portal has a half-round arch that was once decorated with a coat of arms.
