= Strassberg Castle =

Ruined castle in Churwalden, Graubünden, Switzerland

- Burg Strassberg
- Churwalden
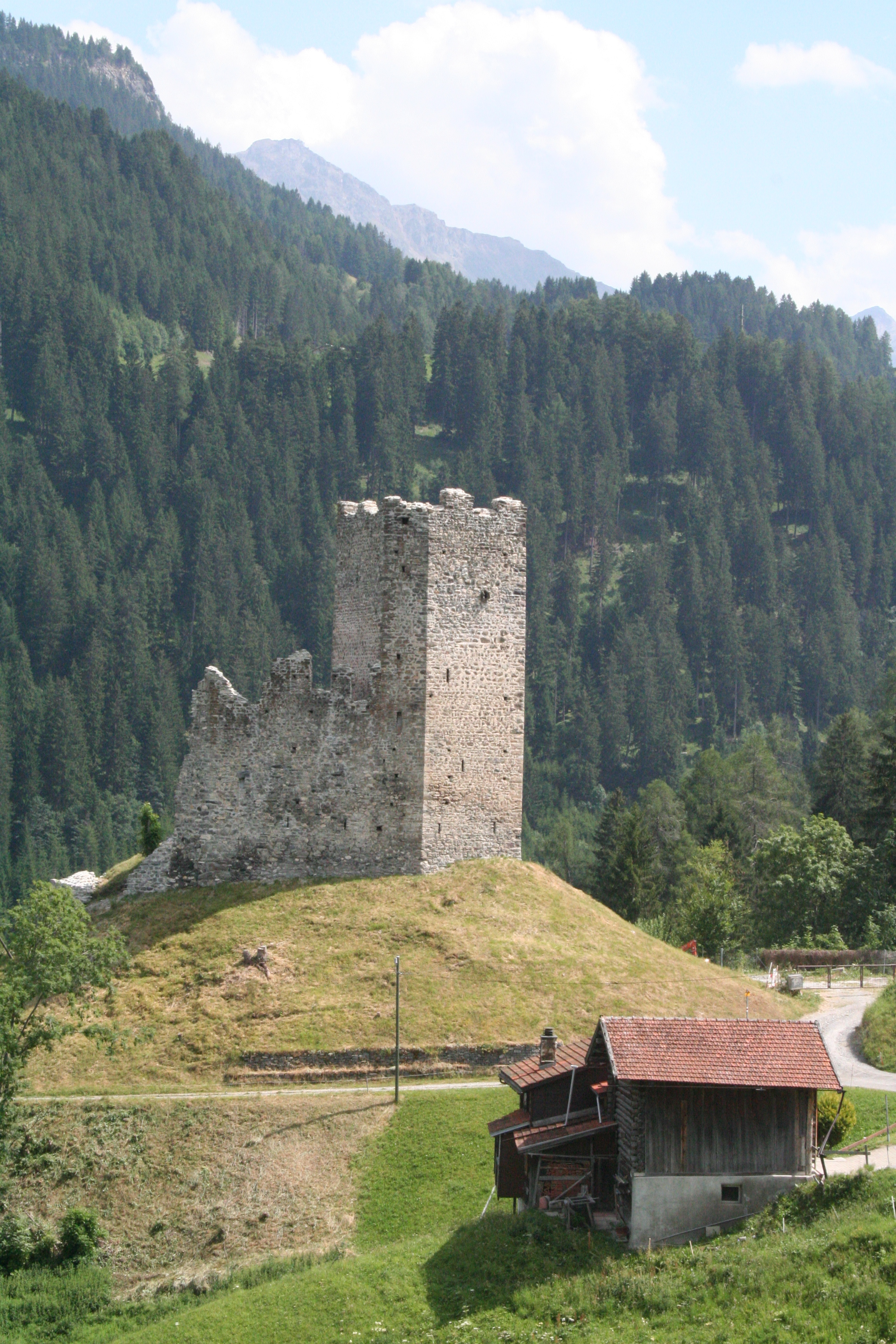
- Ruins of Strassberg Castle from the Northwest

Site information
- Type: hill castle
- Code: CH-GR
- Condition: ruin

Location
- Coordinates: 46°48′23″N 9°32′1.5″E
- Height: 1,100 m above the sea

Site history
- Built: around 1200
- Materials: rubble stone

Garrison information
- Occupants: ministeriales

Strassberg Castle is a ruined castle in the municipality of Churwalden of the Canton of Graubünden in Switzerland.

== History ==
The castle was built in the 12th century to guard the road from Chur over the alpine passes. The oldest part of the castle, the ring wall, was built in the second half of the 12th century. The main tower was added in the early 13th century. The Lords of Strassberg first appear in the historical record in 1253.

The ring wall around the main castle originally had a residential building along the north side and still shows signs of windows and privies. In the 13th century a large, square, four-story tower was added on the west side of the ring wall. East of the main ring wall was another, larger ring wall which may have included a gate house. Very little of this outer wall remains and it is unclear how it connected to the main castle.

The castle is first mentioned in a record in 1275 as castrum dictum Strasceberch and at that time it was owned by the powerful Freiherr von Vaz. The Strassberg family appear to have been ministerialis, unfree knights in service to a higher noble, or vassals of the Vaz family. Strassberg castle allowed the Vaz to collect taxes from trade along the road. In addition, it protected nearby Churwalden Abbey, which was the burial place of the family. After the extinction of the Vaz family, in 1339, the castle was inherited by the Counts of Toggenburg.

The Toggenburg counts received imperial permission to establish a customs station at Strassberg in April 1348. However, the Bishop of Chur objected and by December of the same year, the Toggenburg permission was revoked. Over sixty years later, in 1413, they were able to acquire customs rights from Emperor Sigismund, which when the bishop objected, ended up with Zürich having to arbitrate between the Toggenburgs and the bishop.

In 1360 the last Strassberg died out and the castle passed fully to the Toggenburgs. For the next three quarters of a century several different Toggenburg vassals held Strassberg as a fief. When the last Toggenberg count, Frederick VII, died the castle was inherited by the Counts of Montfort. Probably due to the power of the League of the Ten Jurisdictions Monfort granted the town of Churwalden its freedom and a promise that the castle would always stand open to Churwalden and that the vogt would only live in the castle if the town granted its permission. In 1466 the Counts of Montfort sold the castle to Archduke Sigismund of Austria. A few years later, in 1471 Sigismund sold the castle to Ulrich von Matsch and then inherited it back in 1479.

The castle began to fall into ruin and in 1491 Vogt Disch Ammann von Rhäzüns reported that the castle was somewhat damaged. On 5 March 1499, during the Swabian War, the castle was burned by retreating League troops to prevent it from falling into Austrian hands. By the 16th century it was already a ruin.

The castle ruins were repaired and stabilized in 2008/9.

== Gallery ==
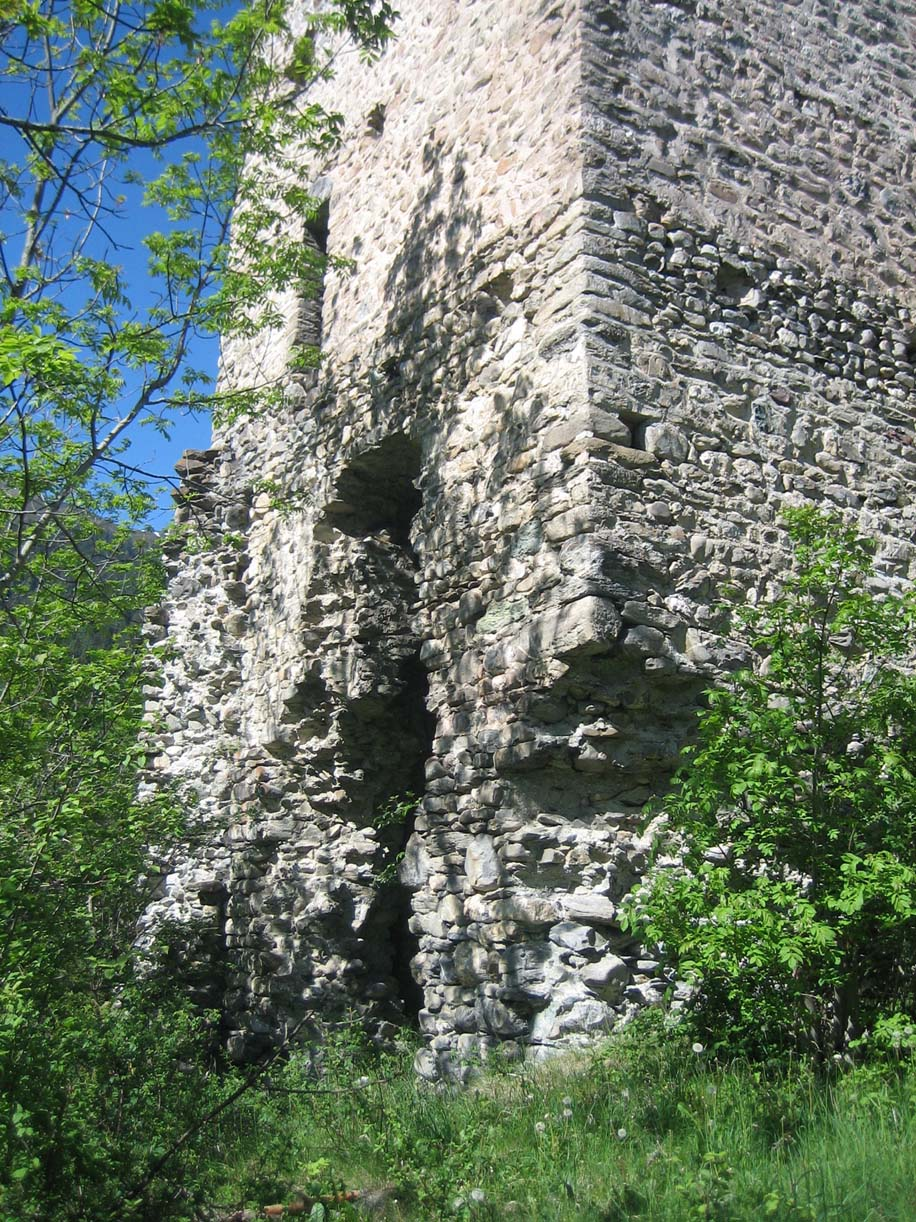
Foundation of the tower, near the old high entrance

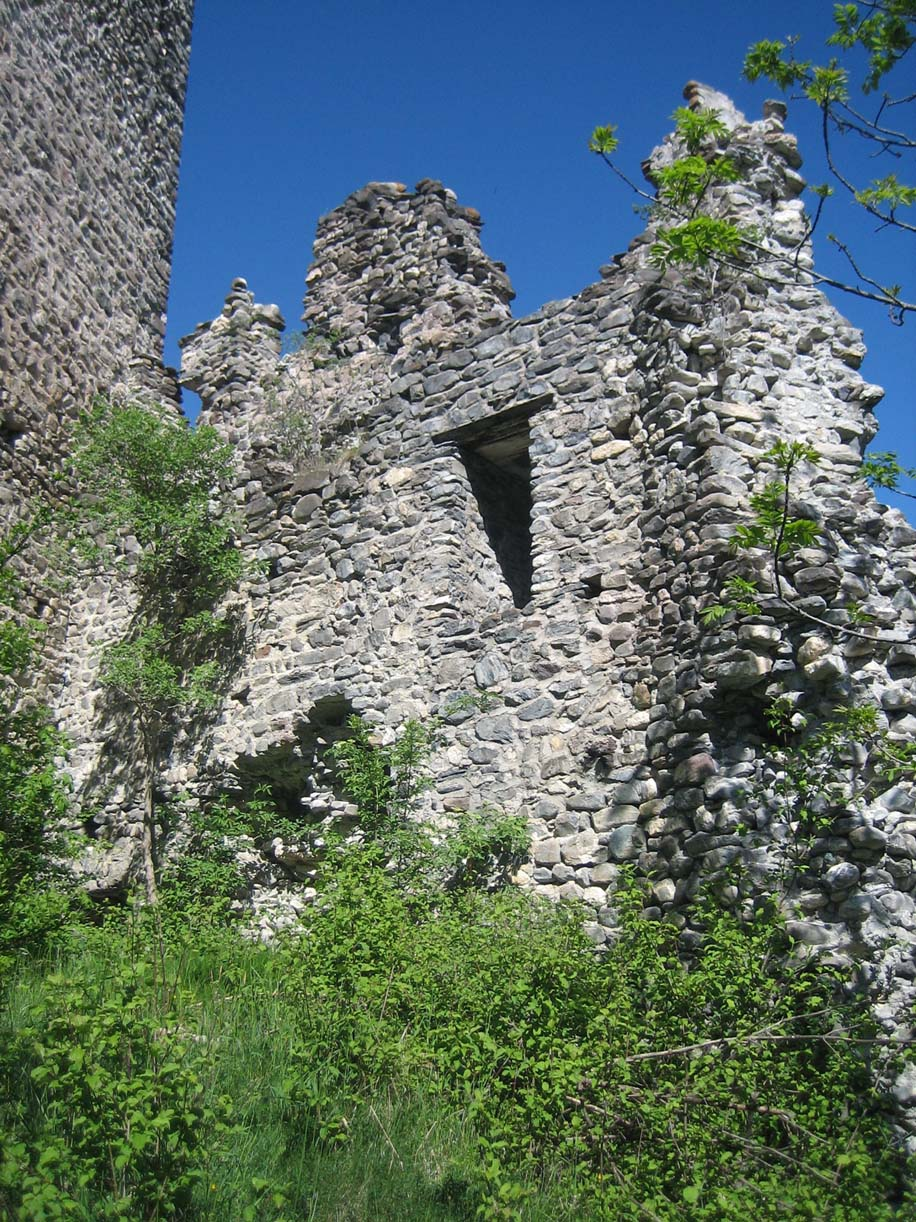
Palas and tower

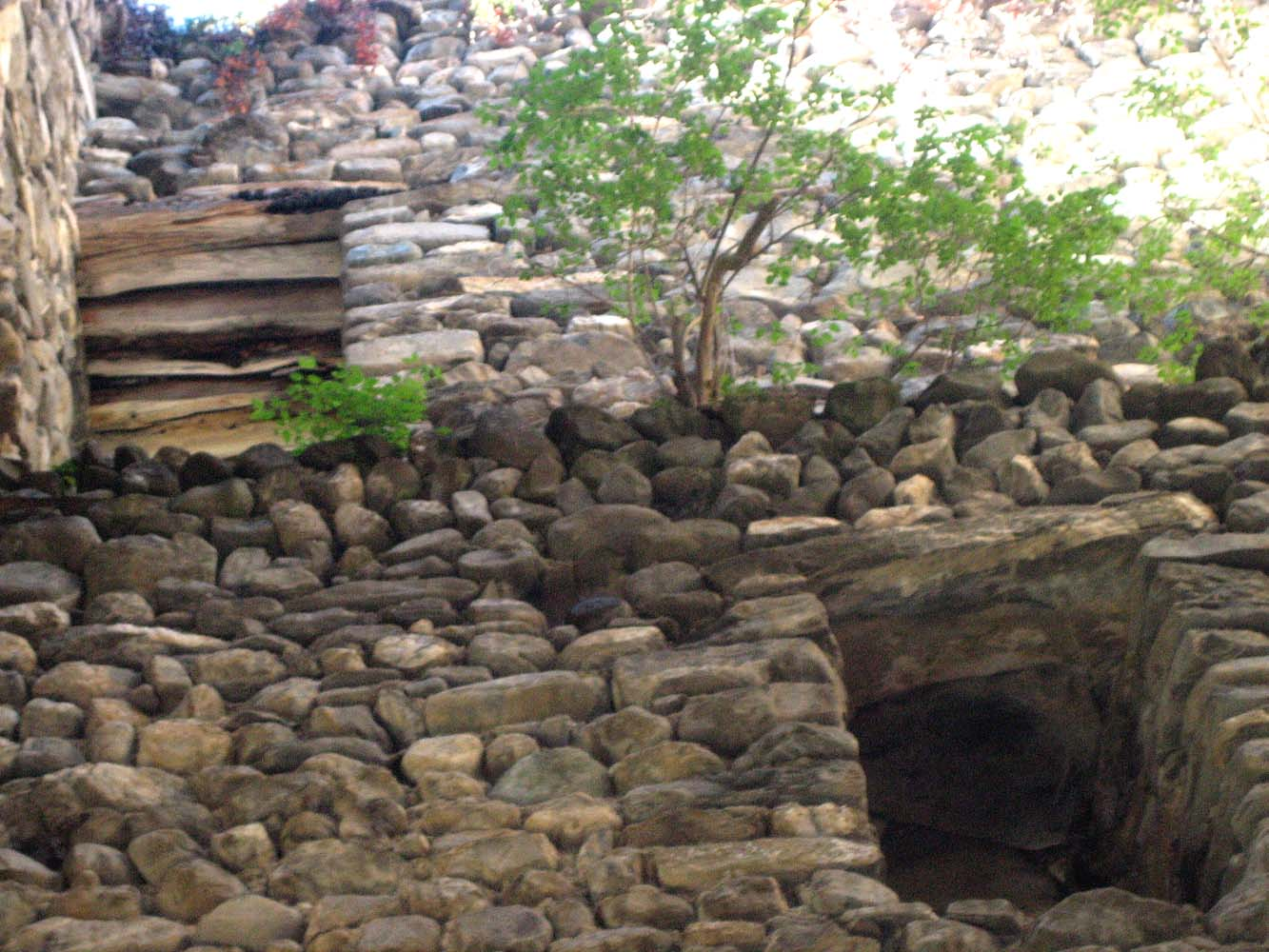
Interior of the tower

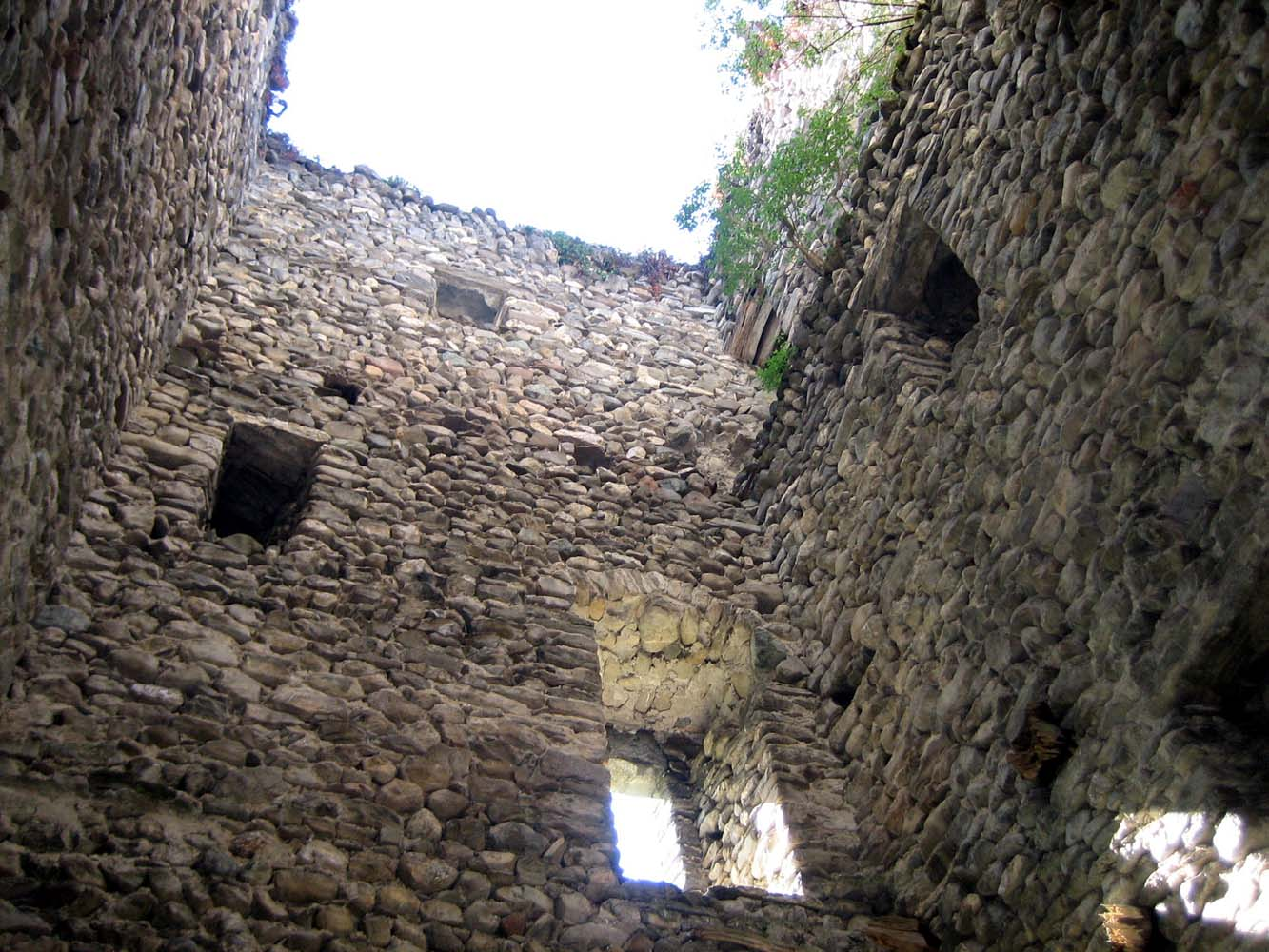
Interior of the tower, looking up

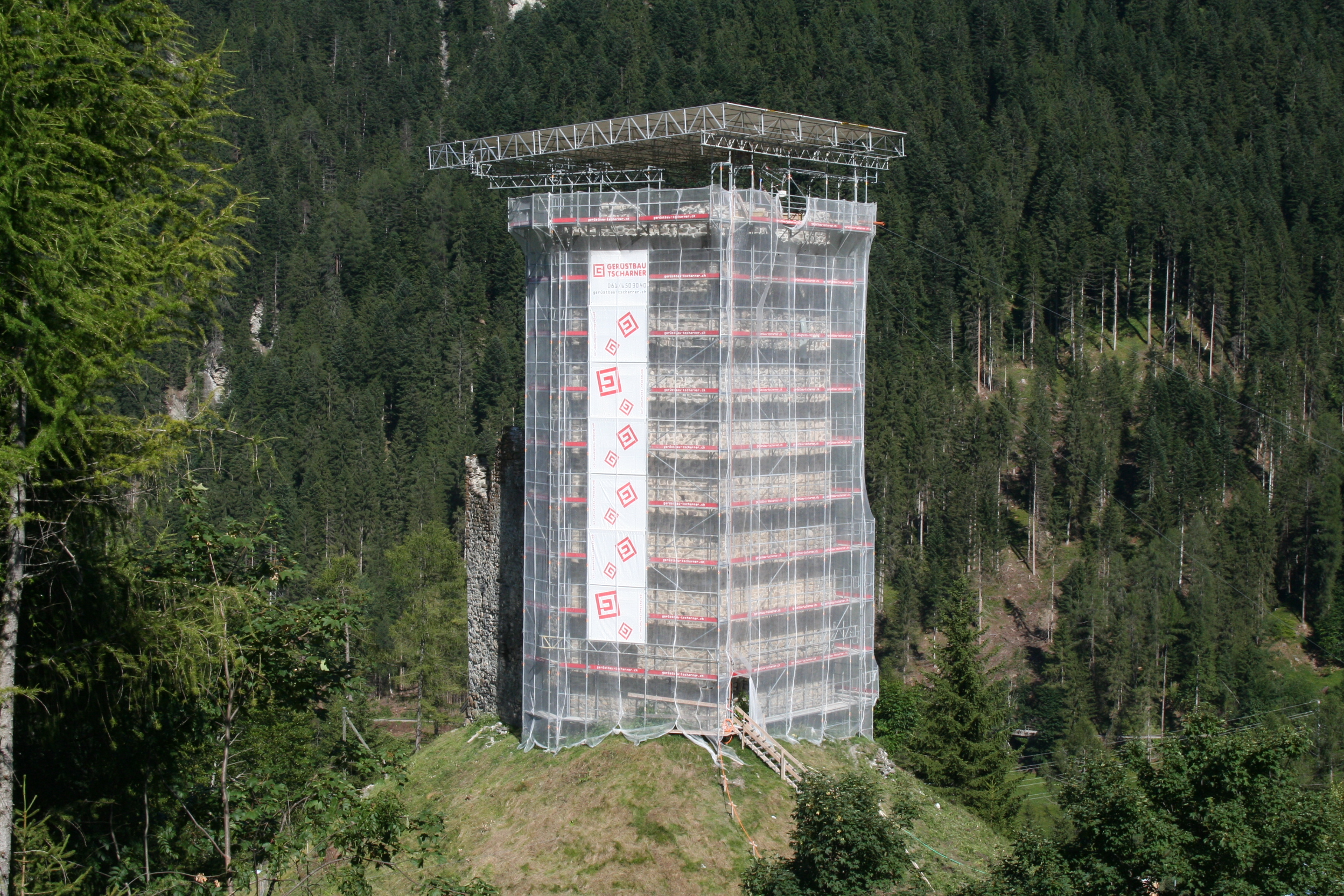
Repairs in the summer 2008

== See also ==
- List of castles in Switzerland
