= Gründjitobel Viaduct =

Gründjitobel Viaduct Gründjitobel-Viadukt
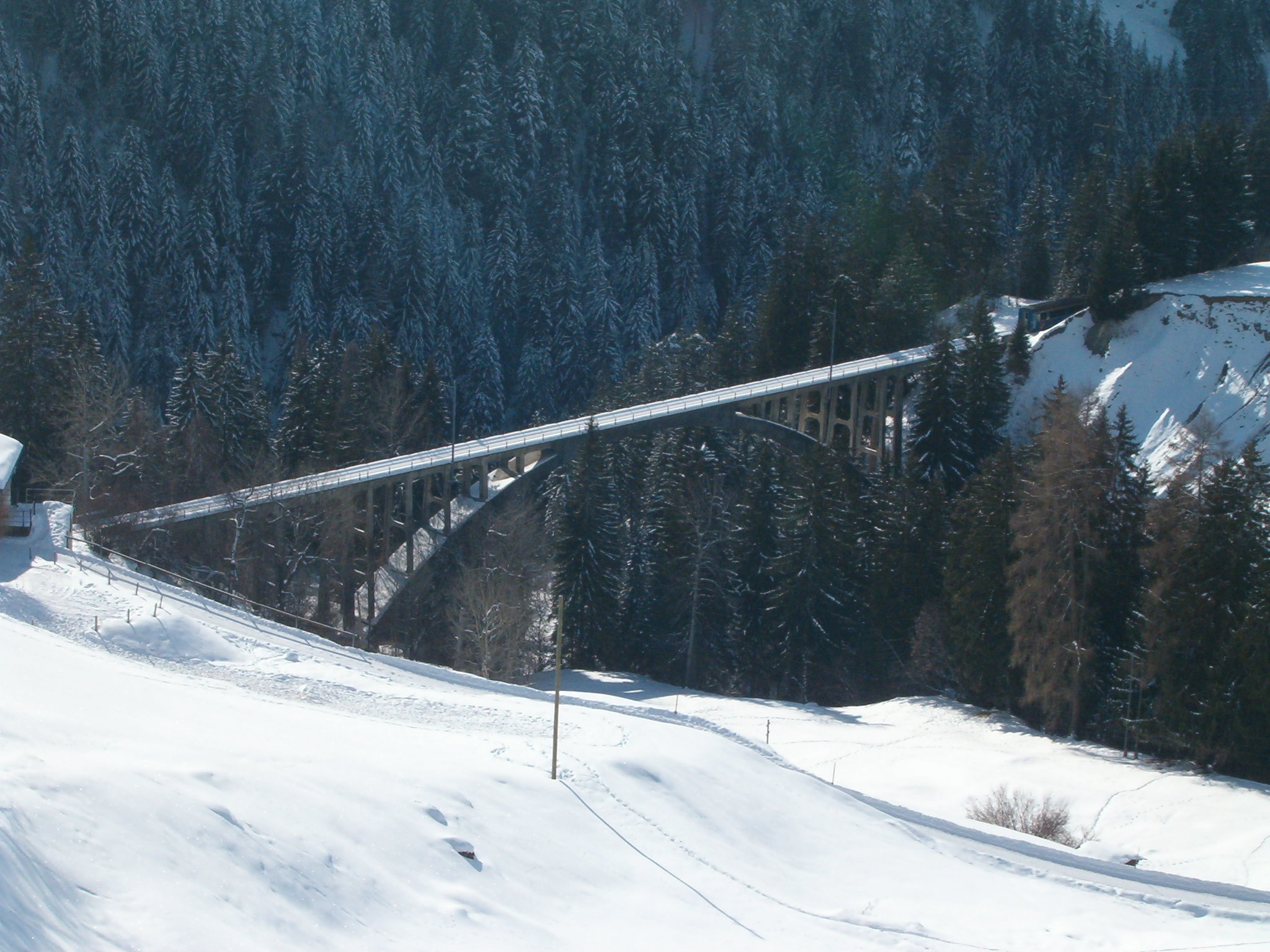
- Gründjitobel Viaduct in winter
- Coordinates: 46°49′29″N 09°41′30″E
- Carries: Rhaetian Railway
- Crosses: Gründjitobelbach
- Locale: Langwies, Switzerland
- Official name: Gründjitobel-Viadukt
- Owner: Rhaetian Railway
- Maintained by: Rhaetian Railway

Characteristics
- Design: Arch
- Material: Reinforced concrete
- Total length: 145 m (476 ft)
- Height: 46 m (151 ft)
- Longest span: 86 m (282 ft)

History
- Designer: Jakob Bolliger
- Constructed by: Müller, Zeerleder und Gobat
- Construction start: June 1913
- Construction end: July 1914
- Opened: December 1914

Location
- Interactive map of Gründjitobel Viaduct

The Gründjitobel Viaduct (or Gründjitobel Bridge; German: Gründjitobel-Viadukt) is a single track reinforced concrete railway bridge, spanning the Gründjitobelbach near Langwies, in the Canton of Graubünden, Switzerland.

Designed by Hermann Schürch, it was built between late June 1913 and early July 1914 by Müller, Zeerleder und Gobat, for the Chur–Arosa railway. It is now owned and used by the Rhaetian Railway.

== Location ==
The viaduct is located on the Rhaetian Railway's metre gauge line from Chur to the holiday and recreation resort of Arosa (the Chur-Arosa line), between Peist and Langwies, at a place known as Matten-Gründji. It leads the railway line over the Gründjitobel, a steeply eroded gravel moraine gorge, with sandy formations known as "Steimannli".

== History ==
Due to the difficult geological conditions in Schanfigg, a total of 18 tunnels and 40 bridges needed to be created between 1912 and 1914 for the privately built Chur-Arosa line. Most of the bridges were constructed in the classical manner, in stone, which was often available in sufficient quantities in the nearby Plessur River valley. In places where the building conditions were especially unpromising, iron bridges were created.

A completely new building method came to be used near Gründji, due to the distance to be overcome by the Gründjitobel Viaduct, and also by the Langwieser Viaduct, located only a short distance to the southeast. At each of these points, instead of a bridge with many multiple openings, a sensational reinforced concrete structure arose with a large single span. The risk that piers might be undermined by the course of the river could thus be met successfully; since the completion of the Chur-Arosa line, the Gründjitobel Viaduct has only rarely been harmed by erosion.

== Technical data ==
The Gründjitobel Viaduct is 145 metres (476 ft) long. The main span consists of an arch with an 85 metres (279 ft) long span, and a rise of 45 metres (148 ft) above the valley floor.

The whole build of the structure proceeded virtually trouble free, and could be completed in just one year. Together with the larger Langwieser Viaduct, which can be considered its prototype, the Gründjitobel Viaduct was, as at the date of its completion, one of the longest spanning railway bridges in the world.

The falsework, which had already been used in the construction of the Halen Bridge in Kirchlindach, Bern, originated, as with the Langwieser Viaduct, from Richard Coray of Trin. The structure was built by the firm Müller, Zeerleder und Gobat.

== Gallery ==
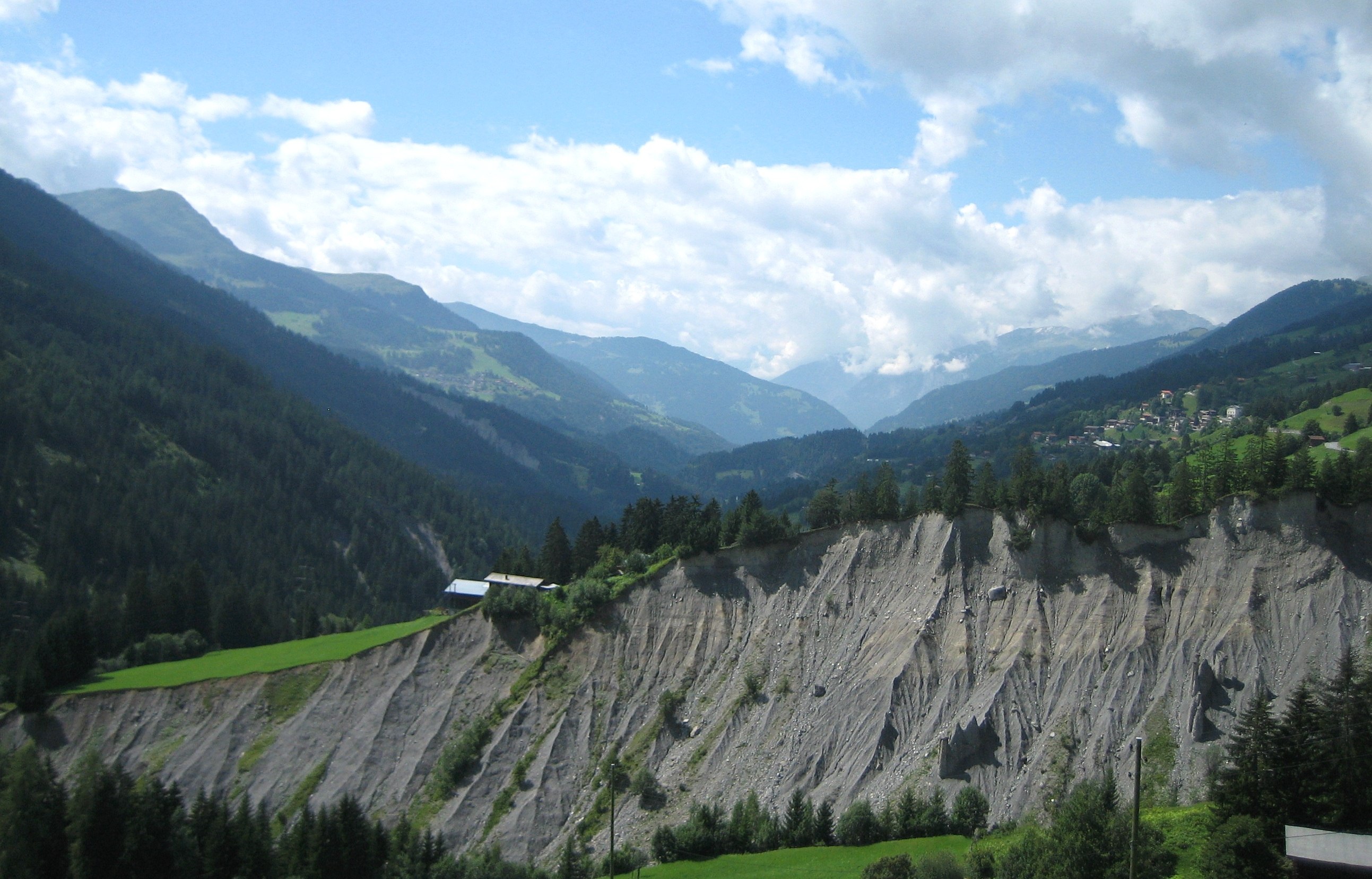
The Gründjitobel and the Steimannli from the east

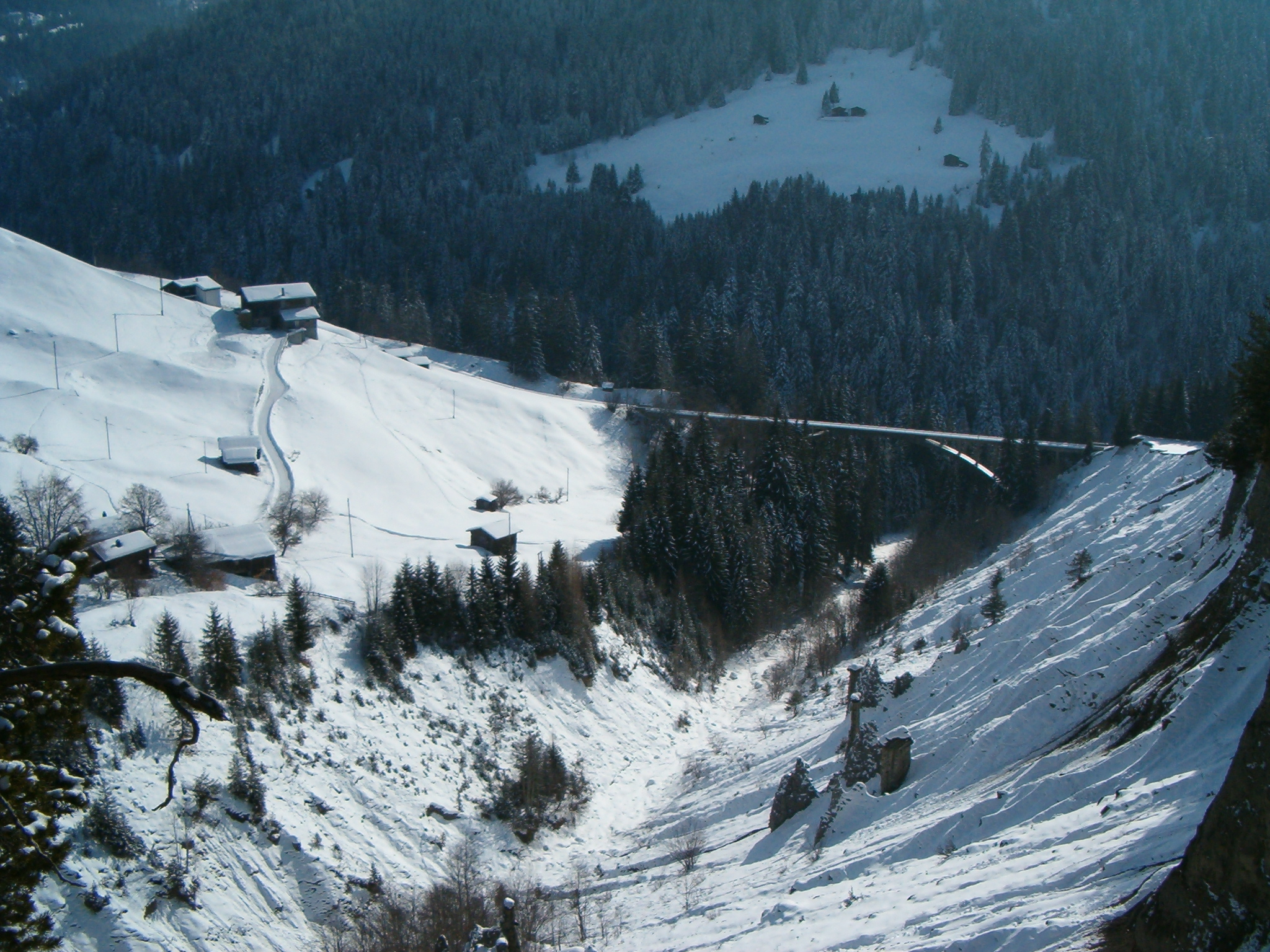
View from the Gründjitobel towards the viaduct

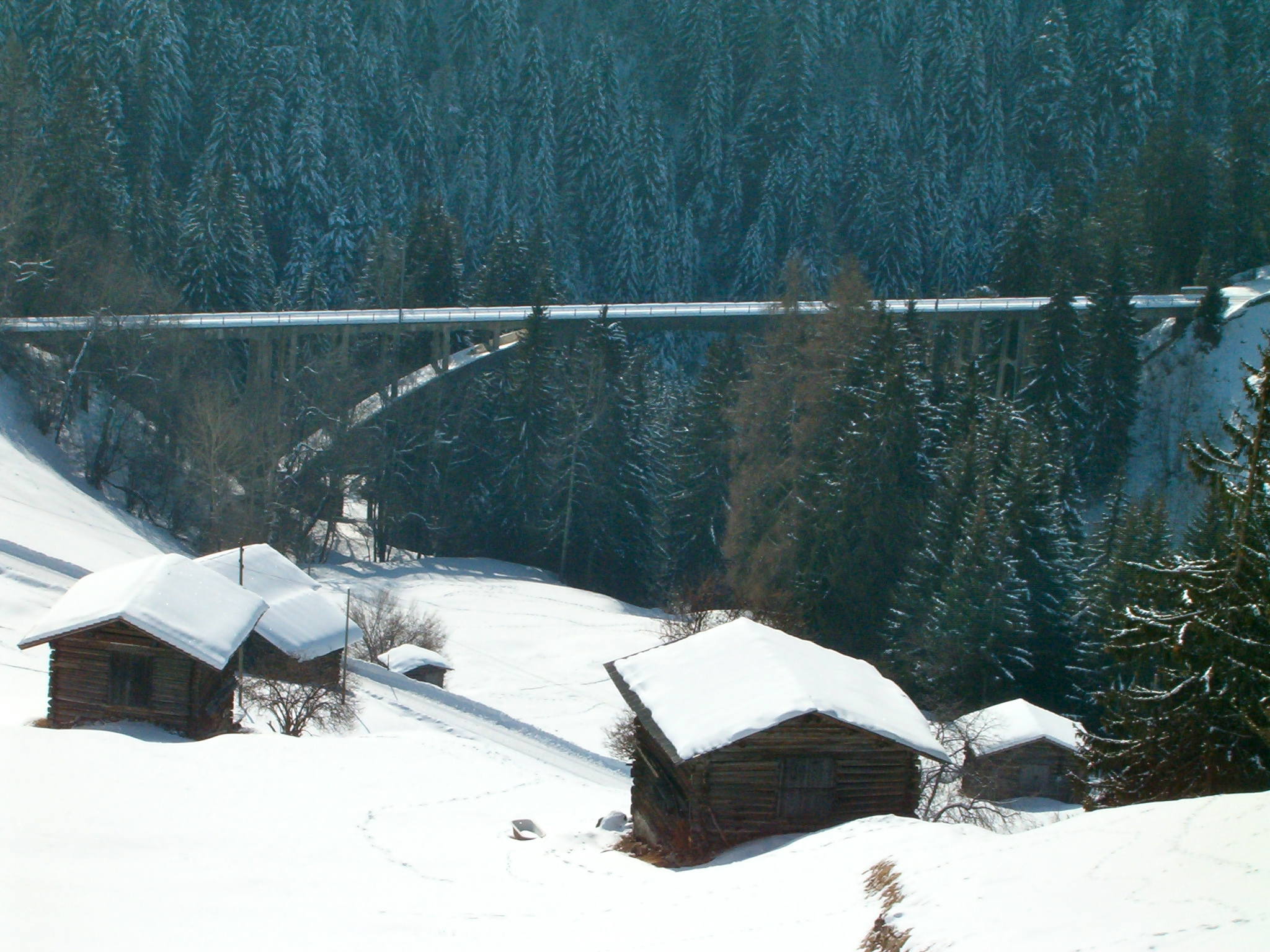
View from Gründji

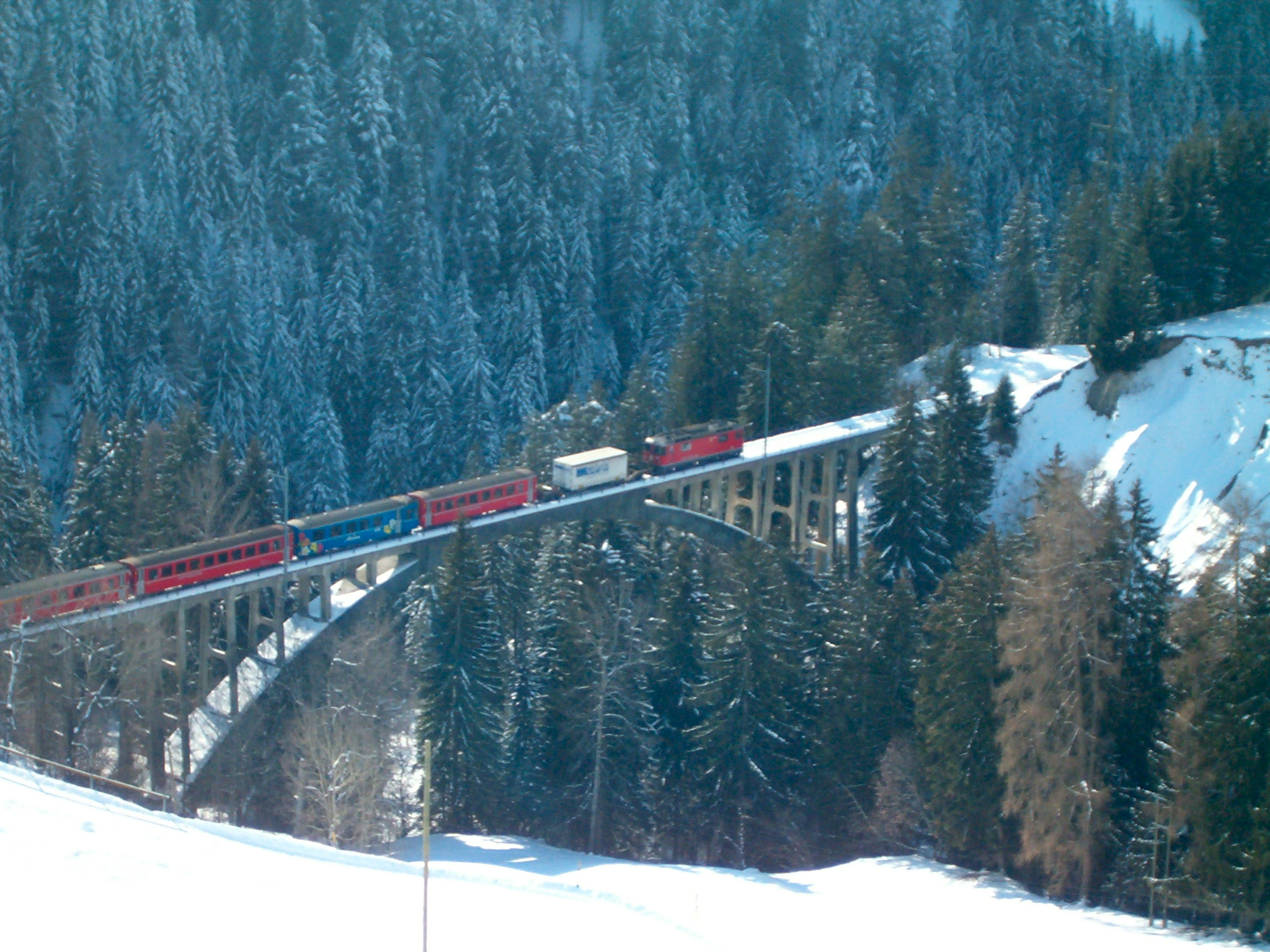
The viaduct with the Arosa Express

== See also ==
- Reinforced concrete
- Arch bridge
- Viaduct
- Langwies (Rhaetian Railway station)
- Peist (Rhaetian Railway station)
- Langwieser Viaduct
- Chur–Arosa railway
- Rhaetian Railway
