= Sassal railway station =

Former railway station in Switzerland

Sassal
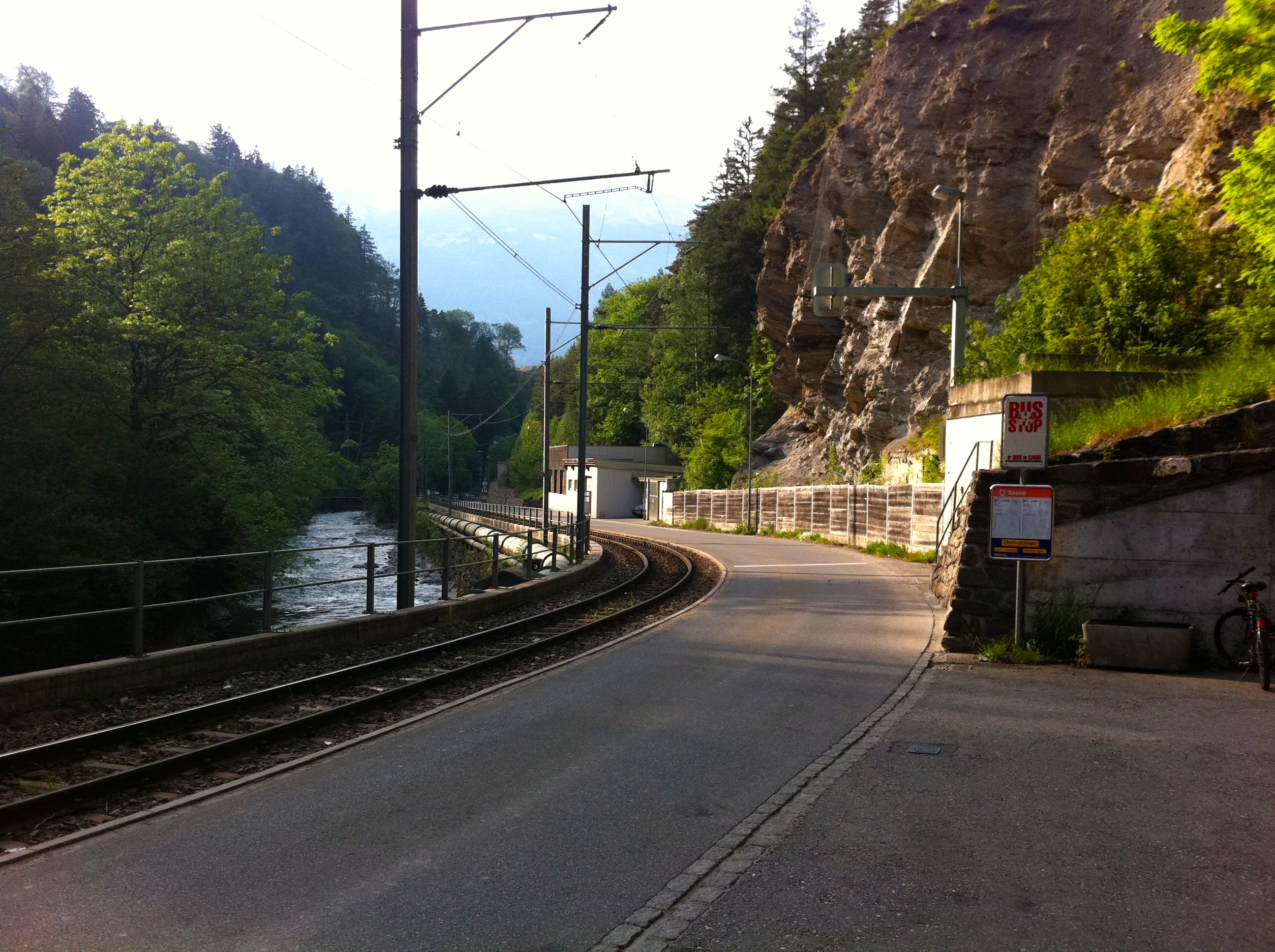

General information
- Location: Sandstrasse 87; 7000 Chur; Plessur, Graubünden; Switzerland
- Coordinates: 46.8382°N 9.5451°E
- Elevation: 620 m (2,030 ft)
- Owner: Rhaetian Railway
- Operator: Rhaetian Railway
- Line: Chur - Arosa
- Distance: 2.239 km (1.391 mi) from Chur railway station
- Platforms: 1

History
- Opened: 12 December 1914
- Closed: c. 2000/01
Location
- Location within Switzerland

Sassal railway station was a small railway station (essentially a halt) on the Chur-Arosa line (the "Arosabahn") of the Rhaetian Railway (RhB). It was situated on the southeastern outskirts of Chur, by the Plessur river, between the city suburb of Sand and the settlement of Meiersboden. The small community of Sassal is located on the other side of the river, on the hillside near Meiersboden.

The RhB has closed Sassal halt in 2001 (that is, passengers can no longer embark/alight there, though trains continue to run through on the line) due to the danger of falling rocks, low passenger numbers, and problems getting on and off trains at this location. This location has suffered from notable landslides in recent times - the mountainside to the rear of the station is unstable - with the railway line and road sometimes obstructed by rockfall.

An alternative public transport service is provided by Chur town bus services which run through to Meiersboden. The nearest open railway station is now the RhB's Chur Altstadt, a street halt, around 1.5 km away towards the centre of Chur.

== Sassal tunnels ==
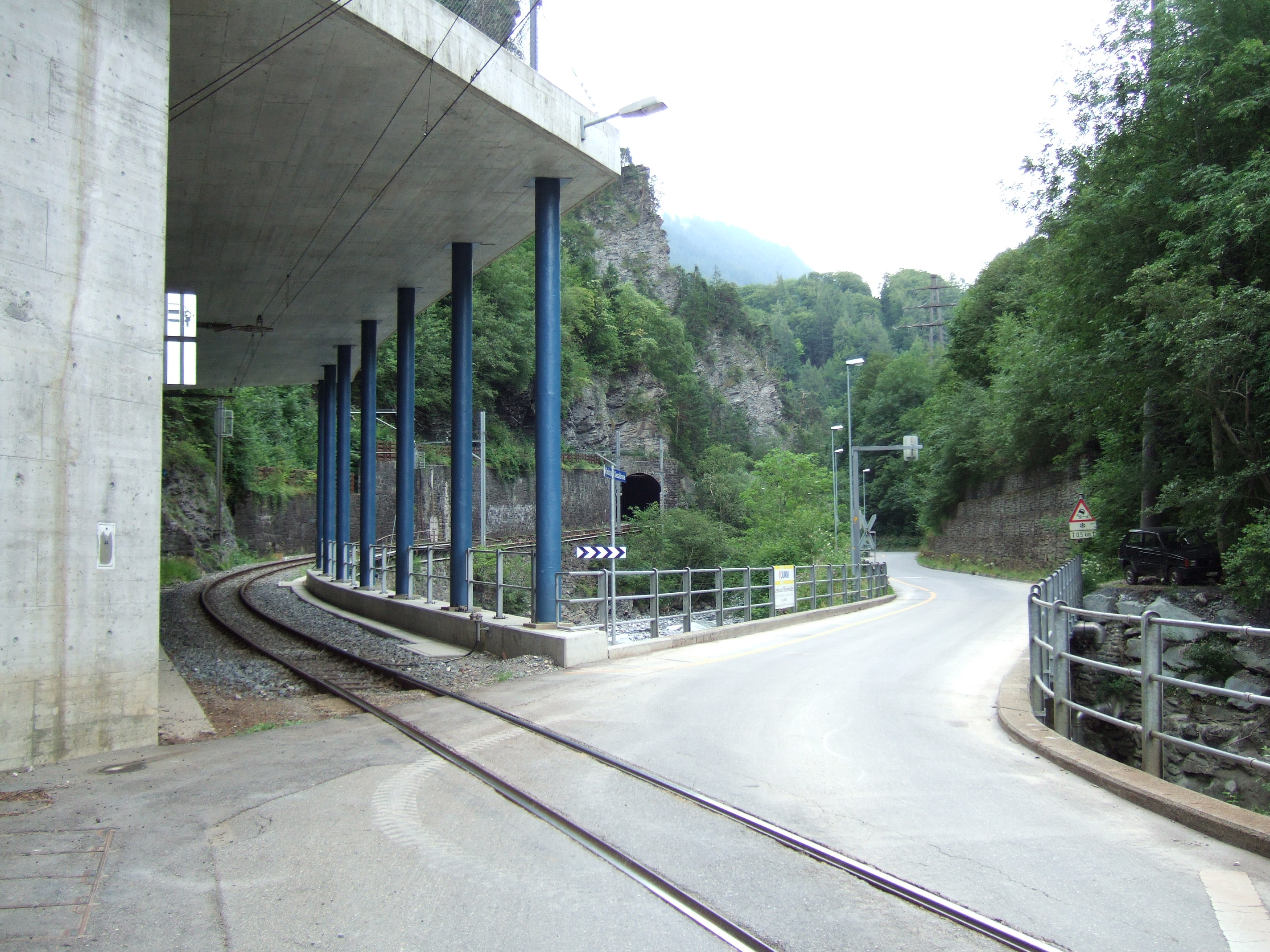
The lower entrance to the first of the Sassal tunnels; the former station is just down the line from here

Immediately after Sassal, the line goes through the three Sassal tunnels, the first tunnels on the route up from Chur to Arosa.
