= Plessur =

Plessur may refer to:

- Plessur (district), an administrative district in the canton of Graubünden, Switzerland
- Plessur Range, a mountain range of the Alps
- Plessur (river), a river in the canton of Graubünden, which discharges into the Rhine
