= Chur Altstadt railway station =

Railway station in Switzerland

Chur Altstadt
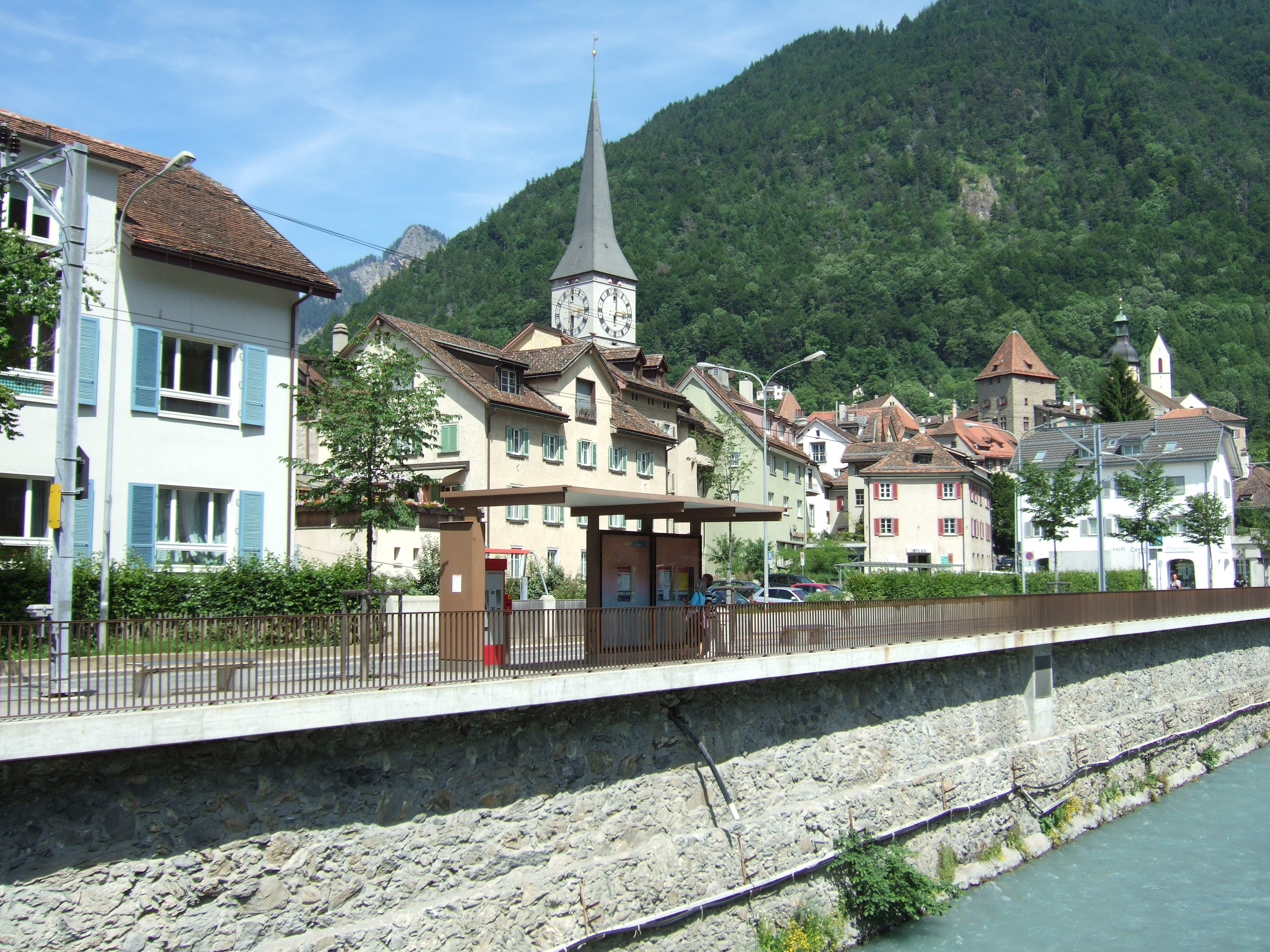
- The halt in 2010 with St Martin's Church behind and the Cathedral further to the right

General information
- Location: Plessurquai; Chur; Switzerland
- Coordinates: 46°50′51″N 9°31′52″E
- Elevation: 595 m (1,952 ft)
- Owner: Rhaetian Railway (since 1942); Chur-Arosa-Bahn (1914-1942)
- Line: Chur–Arosa line
- Distance: 0.762 kilometres (0.473 mi) from Chur
- Platforms: 1
- Train operators: Rhaetian Railway
- Connections: Postauto and local buses

History
- Opened: 12 December 1914
- Former names: Chur Stadt (until 2018)

Services
Preceding station	Rhaetian Railway	Following station
Chur Terminus	RE 6	Langwies GR towards Arosa
Chur Terminus	R 16	Lüen-Castiel towards Arosa
Location

Chur Altstadt railway station is a small railway station (essentially a street halt) on the Chur–Arosa railway (the "Arosabahn") of the Rhaetian Railway (RhB). It is situated near the old town (Altstadt) of Chur, on Plessurquai by the Plessur river, less than a kilometre (0.76 km) from the main railway station of the city. It was called Chur Stadt railway station until 8 December 2018.

The halt is closer to the shops, bars and attractions of the old town than the main station. A number of local and Postauto (see below) bus services converge at Malteser, located nearby where Grabenstrasse and Engadinstrasse converge. A footbridge ("Praximerbrüggli") connects the halt with Lindenquai, on the other side of the river.

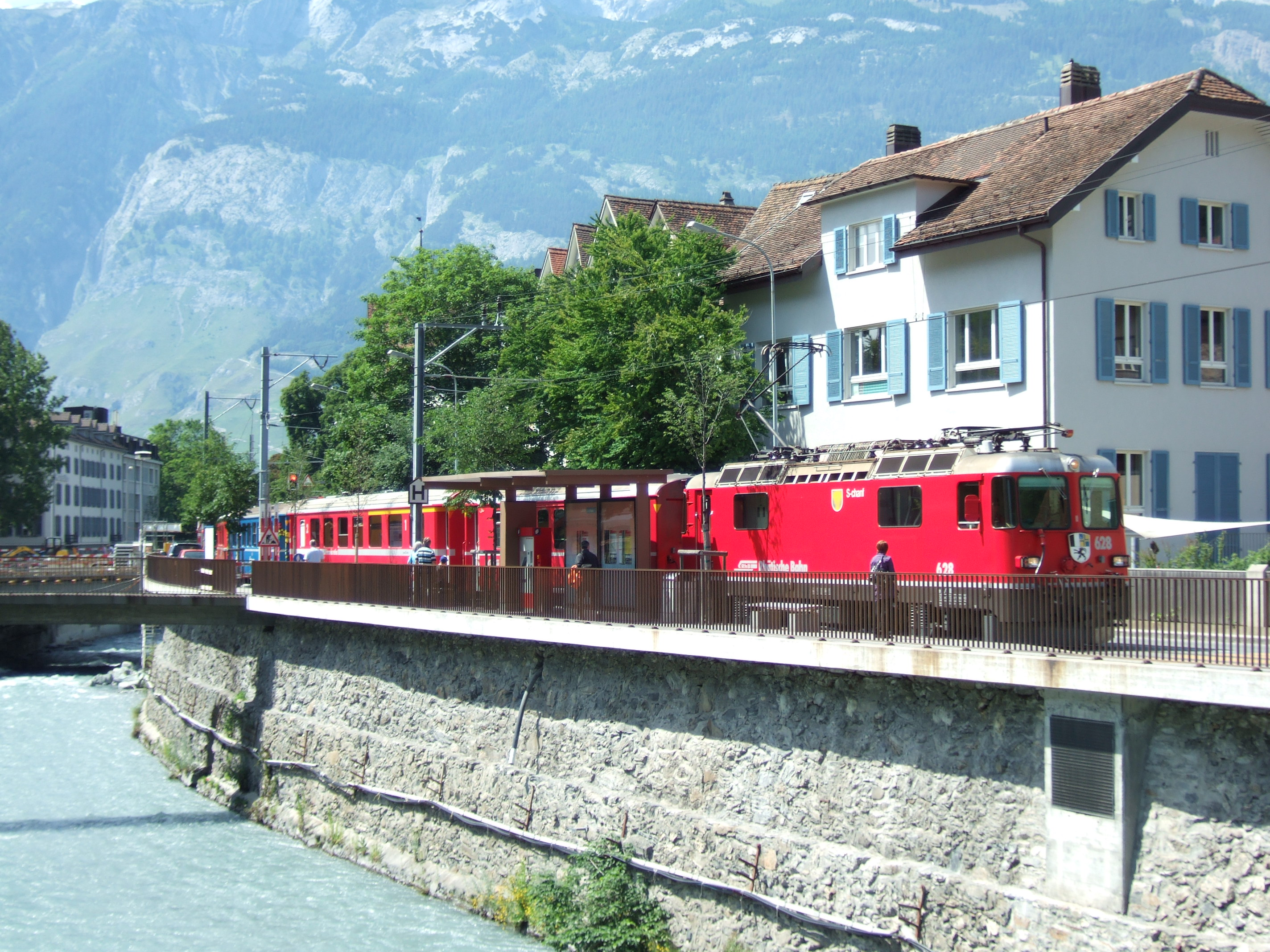
A train for Arosa pulls into the halt

== Stadtbahn ==
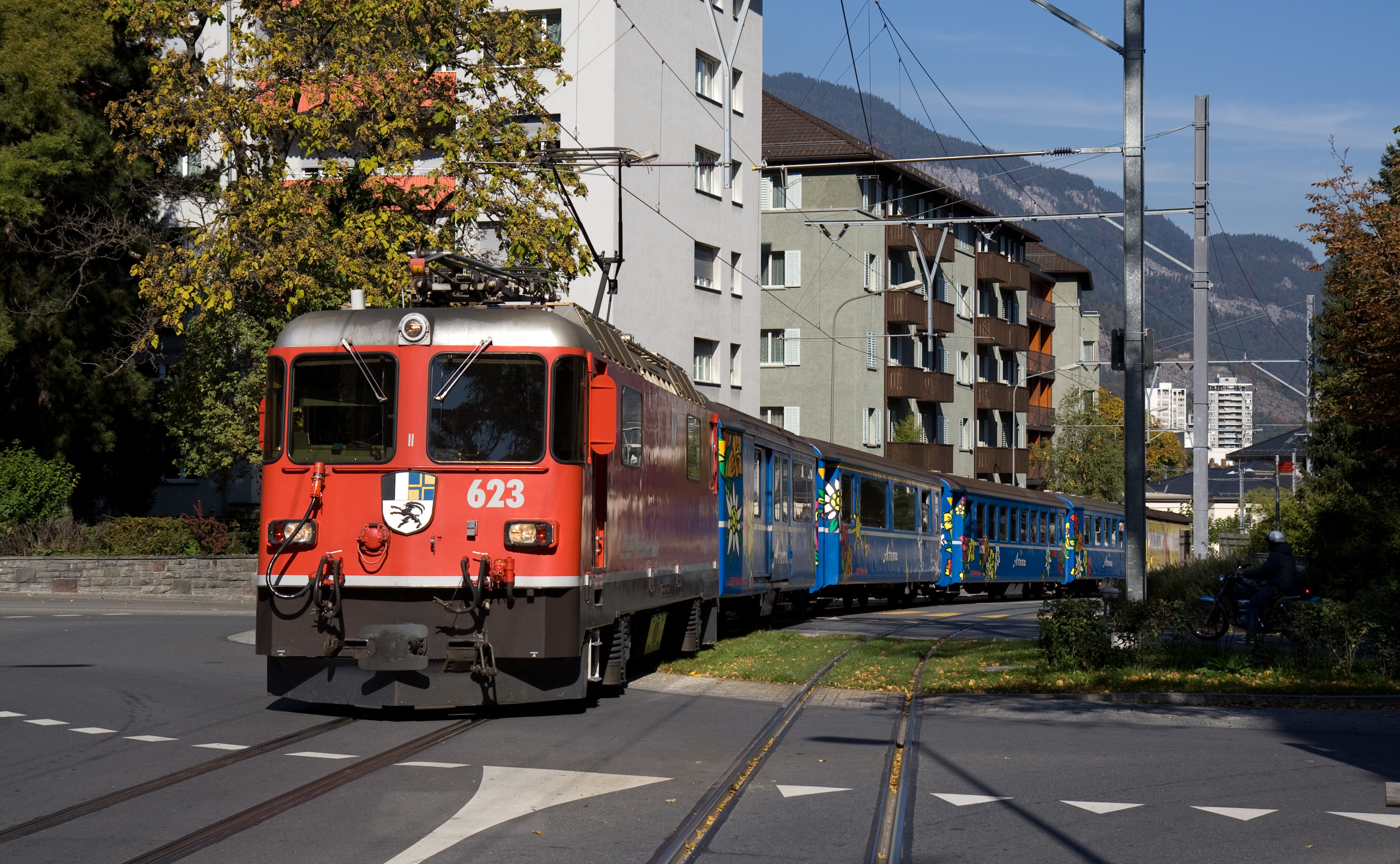
Chur stadtbahn (Engadinstrasse)

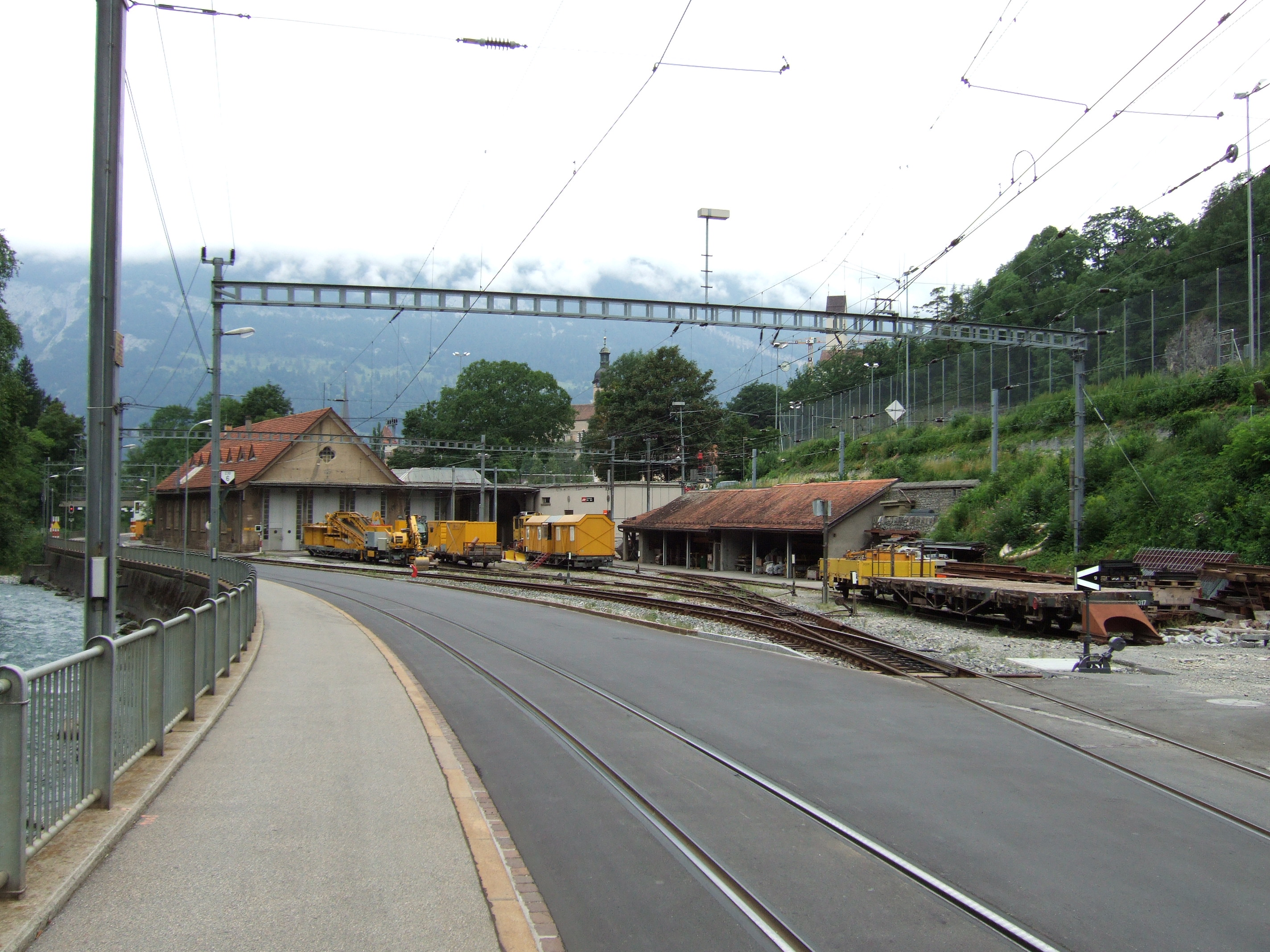
Chur Sand depot; the Plessur and main running line are on the left

The Chur stadtbahn ("town railway") is the part of the RhB line from Chur to Arosa which passes through the centre of the city of Chur, with on-street running. The line starts on Bahnhofplatz, in front of the main railway station, where that station's platforms for the Arosa line are. The line runs along Engadinstrasse from the Bahnhofplatz to the old town, where it then runs briefly along Grabenstrasse and then alongside the Plessur river on Plessurquai ("Plessur Quay"). After Chur Altstadt station, the line continues to run on the road alongside the river, heading up into the suburb of Sand and along Sandstrasse, which is the location of a compact permanent way depot ("Chur Sand") at 1.42 km from the beginning of the line. Shortly after Sand, at Sassal (where there was once a small station on the line, now not used) the line diverges from the road, which crosses the Plessau, and begins its mountainous ascent via the Sassal tunnels.

== Postauto connection ==
Postauto bus services 90.001 (to Tamins and Rhäzüns), 90.041 (to Peist), 90.042 (to Tschiertschen), and 90.181/182 (to Lenzerheide, Tiefencastel, Bivio and St. Moritz) call at the nearby Malteser bus stop.

== Services ==
As of the December 2023 timetable change, the following services stop at Chur Altstadt:

- RegioExpress: four round-trips per day between Chur and Arosa
- Regio: hourly service between Chur and Arosa.

== Gallery ==
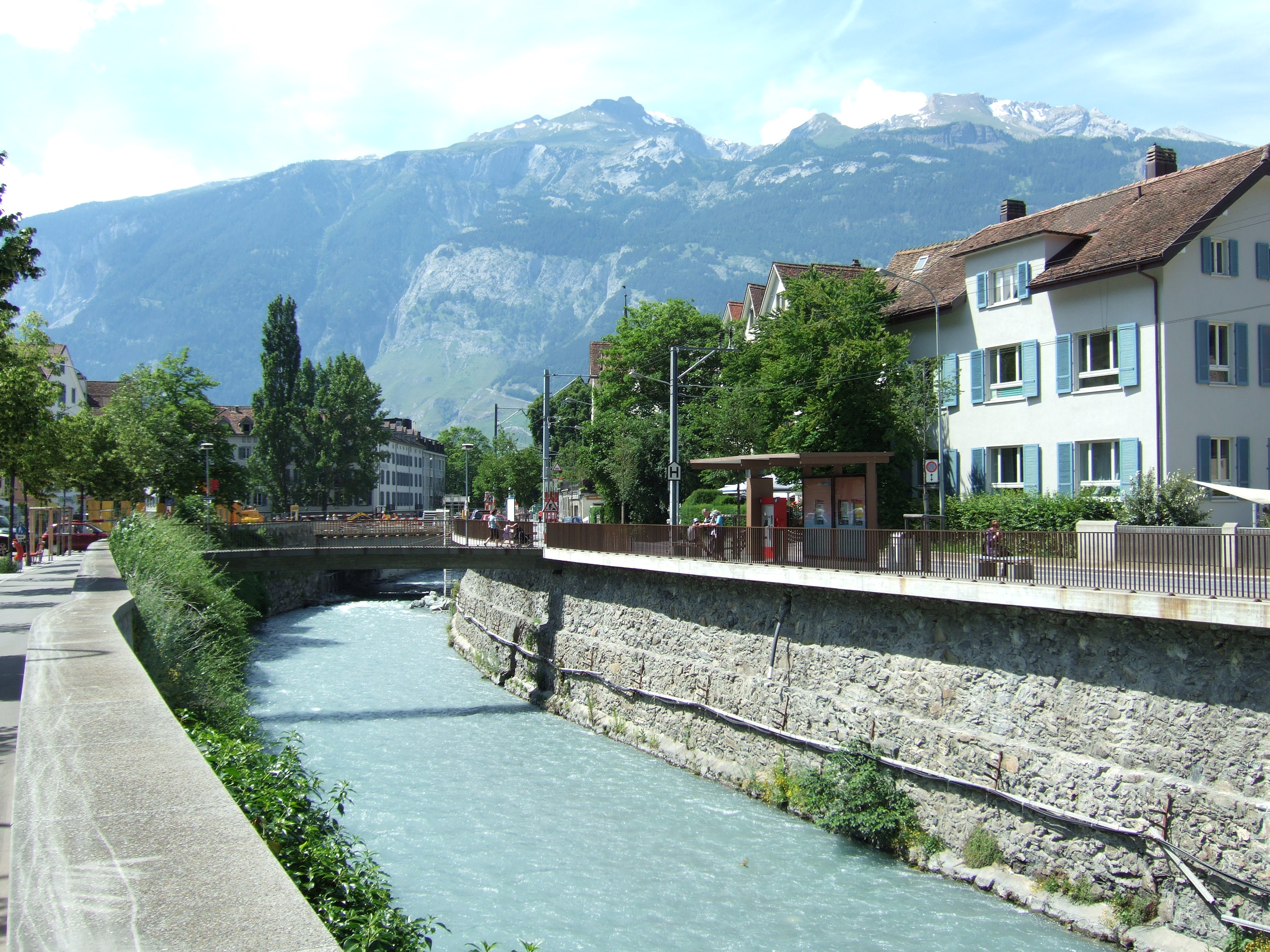
The halt seen from Lindenquai; the Praximerbrüggli footbridge is shown and the Calanda mountain looms in the background

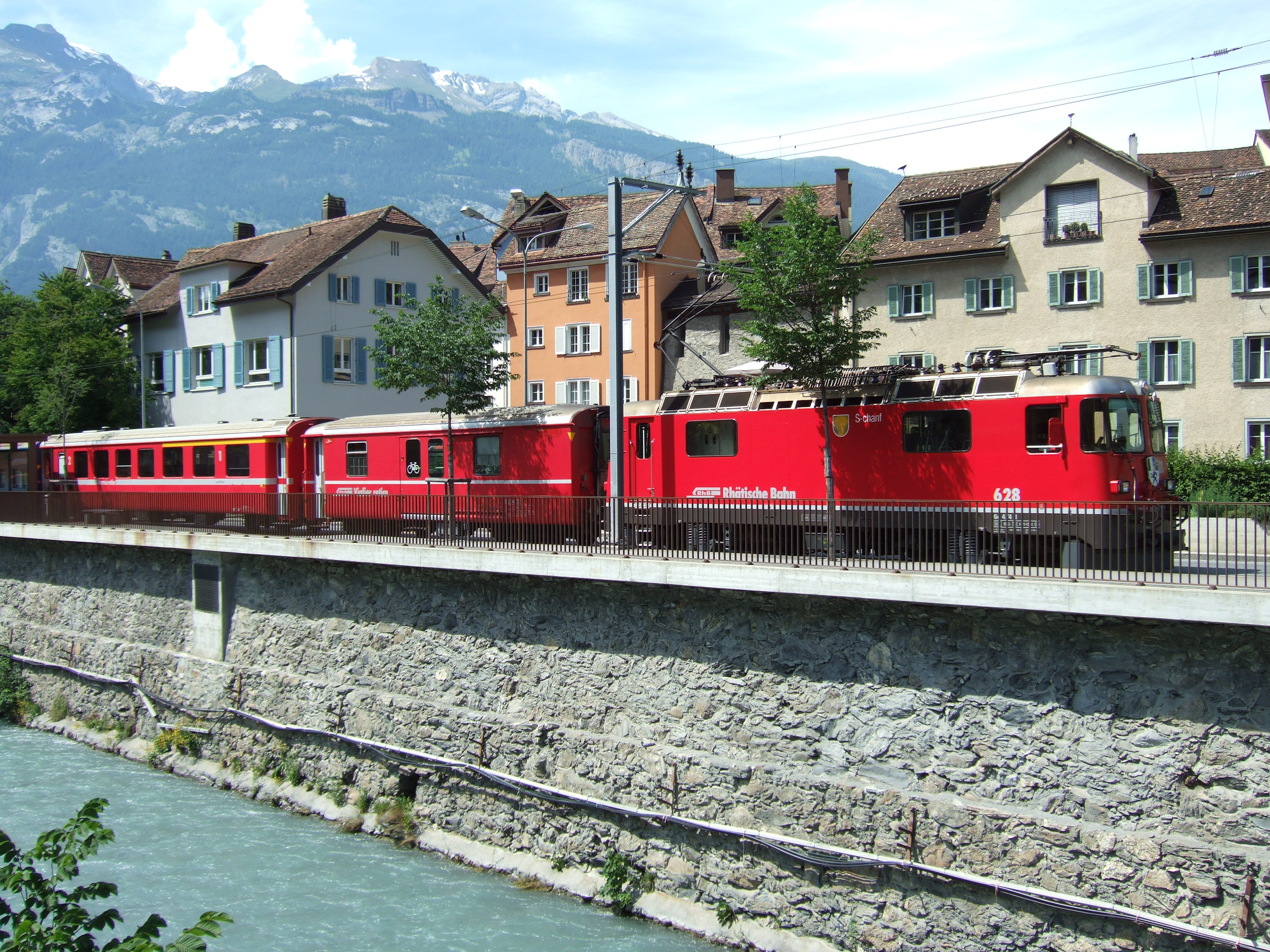
A train waits at the halt

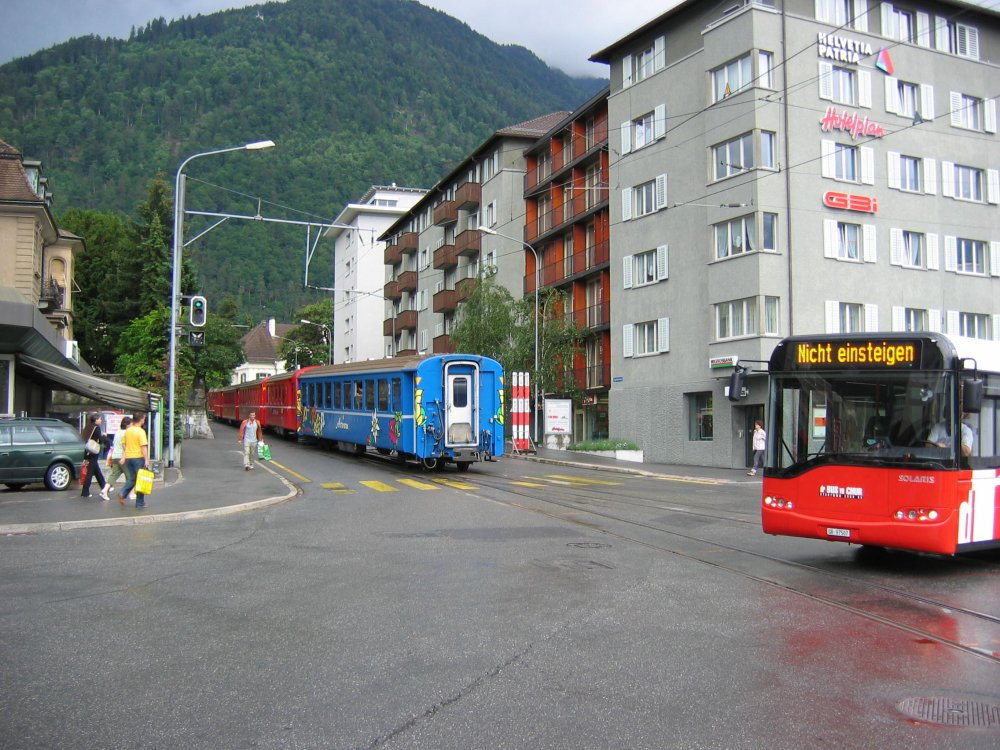
A train leaves the Bahnhofplatz, onto the Stadtbahn on Engadinstrasse

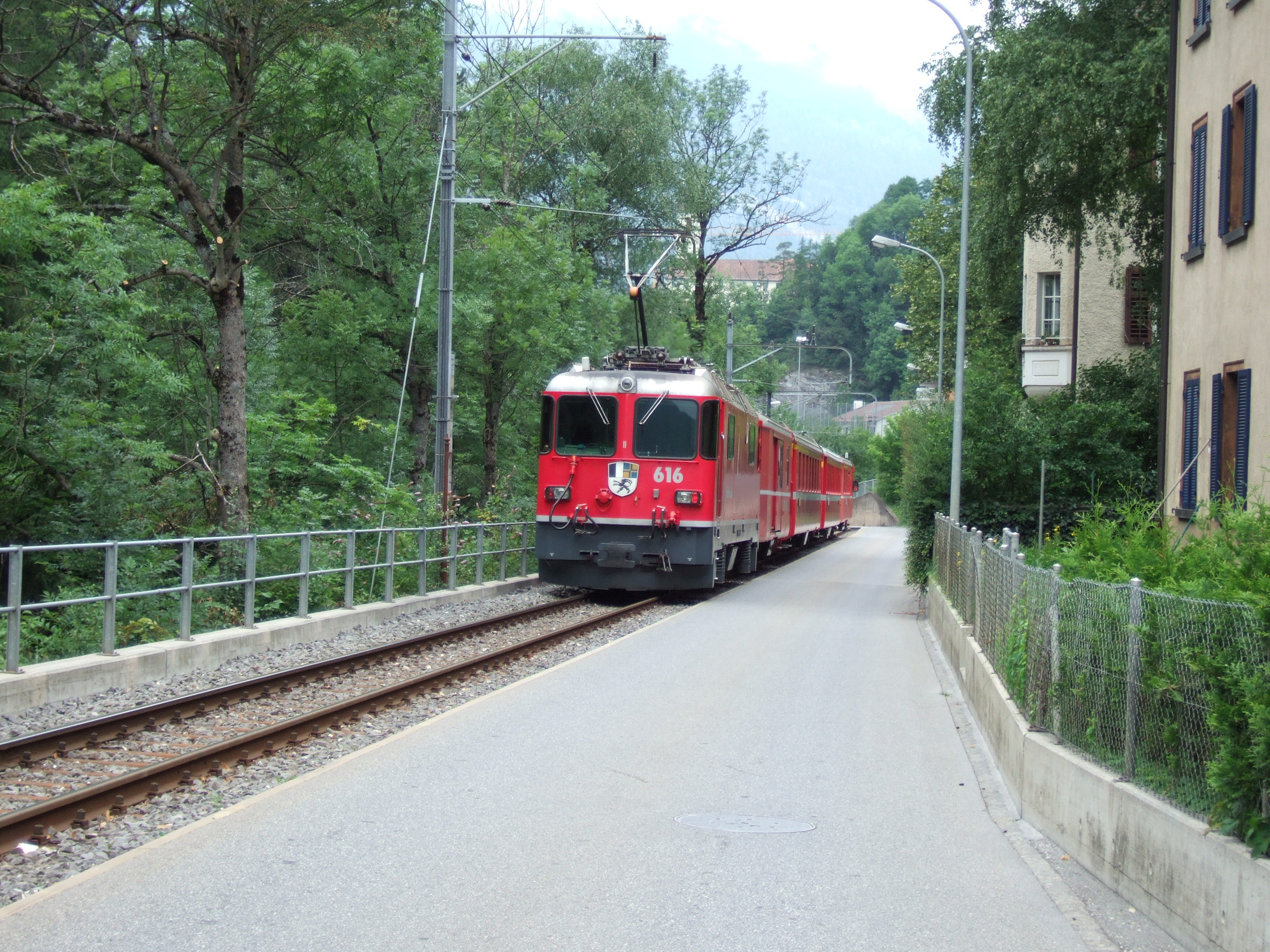
A train heading up the line out of Sand
