= Rabiosa =

Rabiosa may refer to:

- Rabiosa (grape), a white Italian grape variety
- Rabiosa (river), a tributary of the Plessur river in Switzerland
- Rabiosa (song), a song by a Colombian singer-songwriter, Shakira
- Rabiosa di Asolo, a white Italian grape variety
