= Langwieser Viaduct =

Langwieser Viaduct Langwieser Viadukt
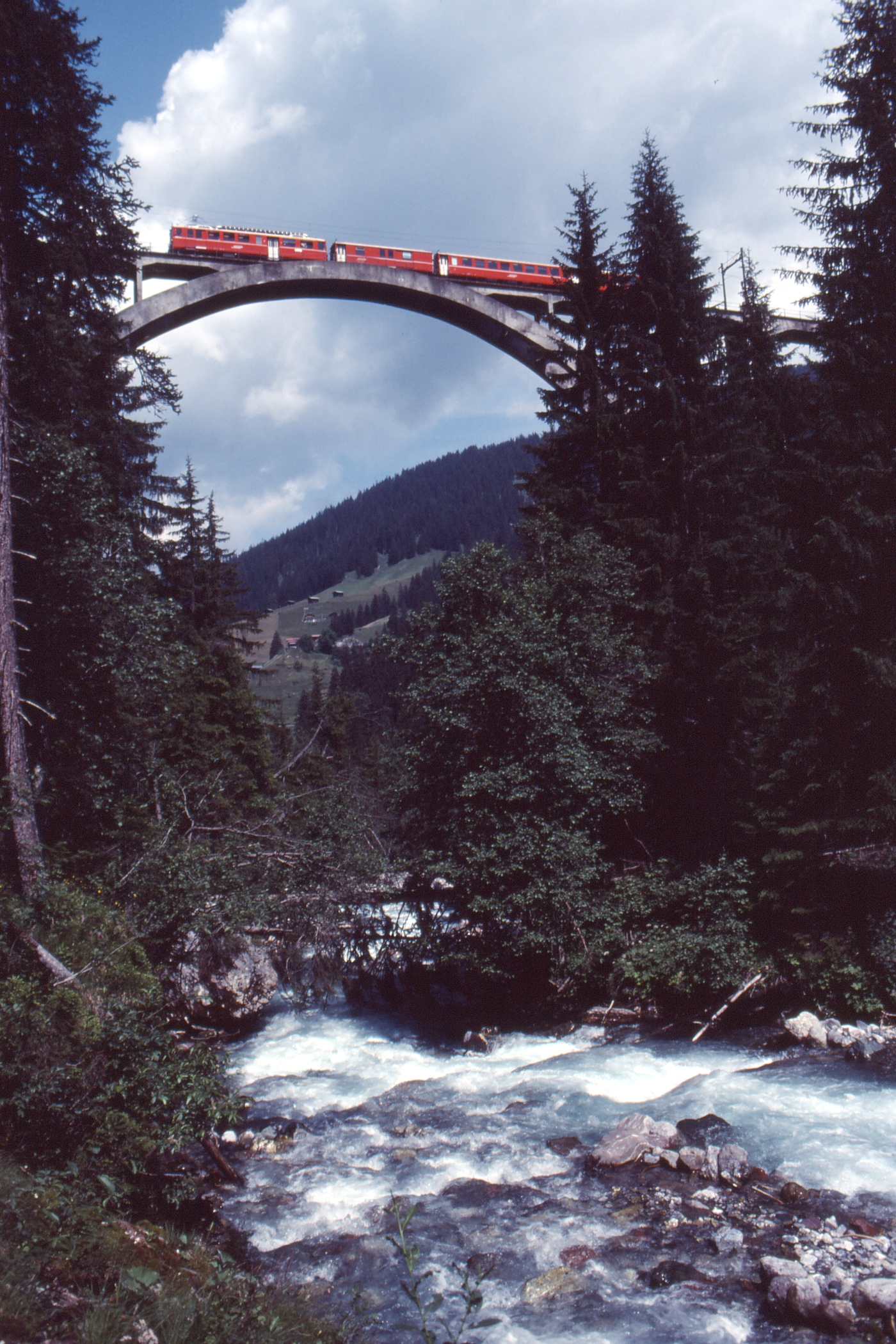
- View from the south
- Coordinates: 46°49′03″N 09°42′18″E
- Carries: Rhaetian Railway
- Crosses: Plessur River, Sapünerbach
- Locale: Langwies, Switzerland
- Official name: Langwieser Viadukt
- Owner: Rhaetian Railway
- Maintained by: Rhaetian Railway

Characteristics
- Design: Arch
- Material: Reinforced concrete
- Total length: 284 m (932 ft)
- Height: 62 m (203 ft)
- Longest span: 100 m (330 ft)

History
- Construction start: 1912
- Construction end: 1914
- Opened: December 1914

Location
- Interactive map of Langwieser Viaduct

The Langwieser Viaduct (or Langwies Viaduct; German: Langwieser Viadukt) is a single track reinforced concrete railway bridge spanning the Plessur River and the Sapünerbach, near Langwies, in the Canton of Graubünden, Switzerland.

It was designed by Hermann Schürch and constructed between 1912 and 1914 by Eduard Züblin for the Chur–Arosa railway. At the time of its completion, the Langwieser Viaduct was the first railway bridge anywhere in the world made of concrete to possess a span of 100 meters, as well as the first railway bridge of such a scale to be made of concrete.

Presently, the Langwieser Viaduct is owned and used by the Rhaetian Railway; it remains the biggest bridge on the company's network. It has also been listed as a Swiss heritage site of national significance in light of its status as a pioneering reinforced concrete structure.

== Location ==
The Langwieser Viaduct is located on the Rhaetian Railway's metre gauge line from Chur to the holiday and recreation resort of Arosa (the Chur–Arosa line). It carries the railway line over the Plessur River valley, immediately up the line from Langwies station.

While most of the line's bridges are composed from locally-source stone, a decision that had been a specified preference of the route's chief engineer Gustav Bener, this was not possible at the location of the Langwieser Viaduct. The soil lacked sufficient bearing capacity, comprising high levels of gravel and sand, and was a generally very difficult to build a bridge upon; it did not allow for suitable foundations upon which to build a stone bridge.

== History ==
The line from Chur to Arosa was the last of the railway lines in the Rhaetian Railway's so-called core network to be constructed. During its building, the Arosa line pioneered the use of numerous new construction methods and techniques. A total of 19 tunnels and 52 bridges are present along the track between Chur and Arosa due to the predominantly challenging terrain present.

Erected between 1912 and 1914, the Langwieser Viaduct was the world's first railway bridge to be constructed of reinforced concrete, and at that time represented a significant breakthrough; furthermore, it was one of the only structures of its size to be constructed entirely out of ferroconcrete. At the time of its erection, the Langwieser Viaduct was the longest railway bridge anywhere in the world. Simultaneously, a "little brother" of the Langwieser Viaduct, the 139 metres (456 ft) long Gründjitobel Viaduct, was built about 1.8 kilometres (1.1 mi) downstream.

== Technical data ==
The Langwieser Viaduct possesses a length of 284 metres (932 ft), a width of 3.7 metres (12 ft), and ground clearance of 62 metres (203 ft). The main span consists of a 100 metres (330 ft) long arch, with a rise of 42 metres (138 ft); at the time of its completion, it possessed the largest span of any railway bridge in the world. The Langwieser Viaduct has a total of 13 openings. The rail carriers have a plate beam cross section rigidly connected with the carriers. The only divisions are between the main arch and the two foreshore areas; these separations are constructed as double piers.

The plans for the Langwieser Viaduct were largely the work of Hermann Schürch, while the chief engineer and the building contractor for its construction was Eduard Züblin. The static computations were performed by Karl Arnstein. During its construction, an extensive timber falsework was assembled on site to temporarily support the bridge. The falsework, which used 800 cubic metres of wood, was regarded as an achievement in itself, produced by the carpenter Richard Coray of Trin. Structurally, the Langwieser Viaduct possesses a high level of efficiency, when validated during its final loading test, it demonstrated a deflection of less than 1 mm even when was loaded by a steam locomotive and three heavily laiden freight cars.

The materials used for building the Langwieser Viaduct were determined by several criteria. Stone was not a realistic choice due to unfavourable local geology, the foundations for a heavy structure were impractical. Furthermore, while iron was a technical possibility, the challenges of transporting the material to the construction site caused it to be deemed unfeasible as well, leaving concrete as the only possible alternative available during this era. A total of 7,469 cubic meters of concrete were used during the Langwieser Viaduct's construction, considerably more than the 4,861 cubic meters originally projected, which has been attributed to the need to better establish its foundations. In addition, the concrete was combined with 250 tons of steel, which reinforces and supports the structure. The final cost of the Langwieser Viaduct's construction was around 625,000 CHF, discounting reinforcement.

== Gallery ==
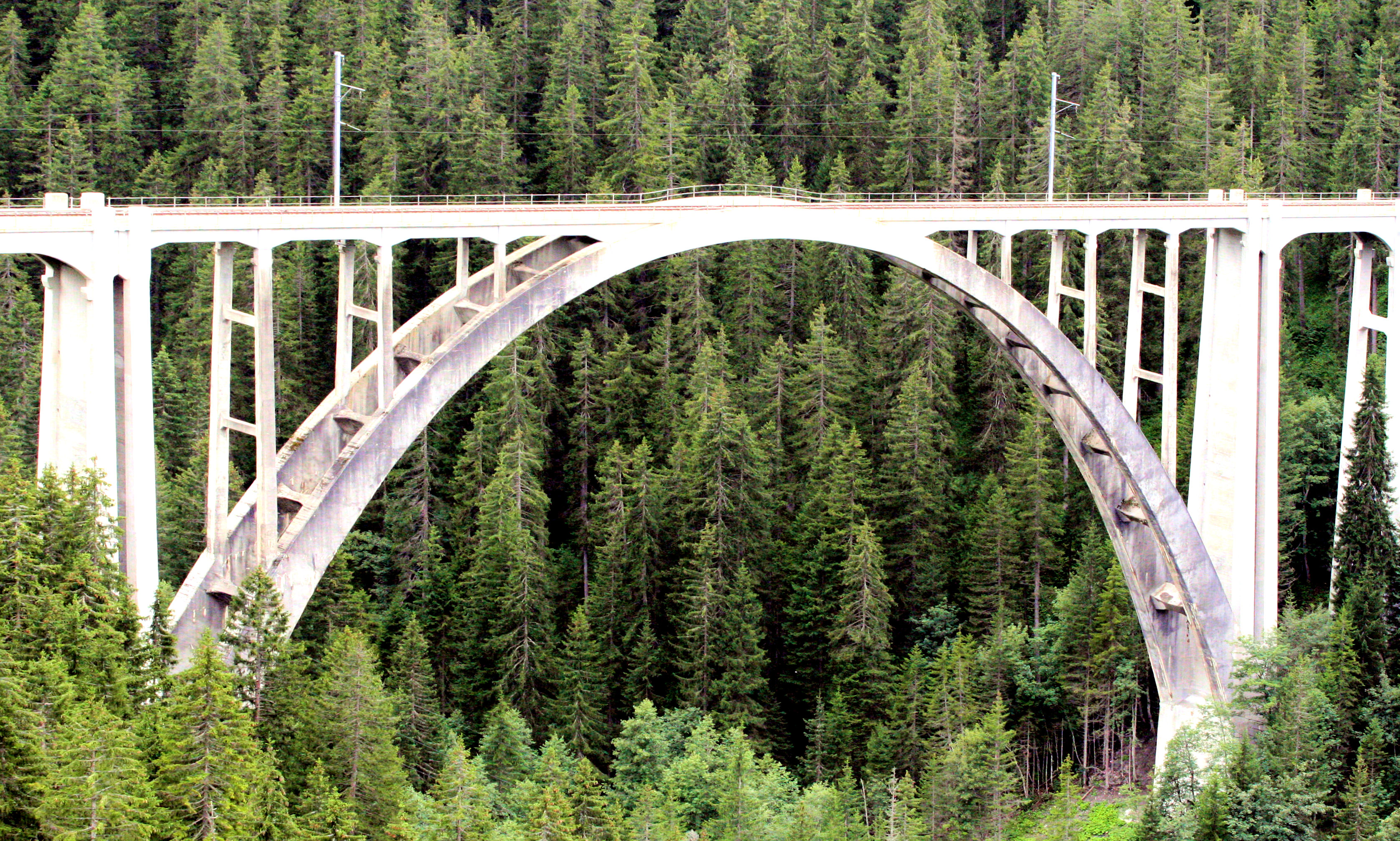
View from the north

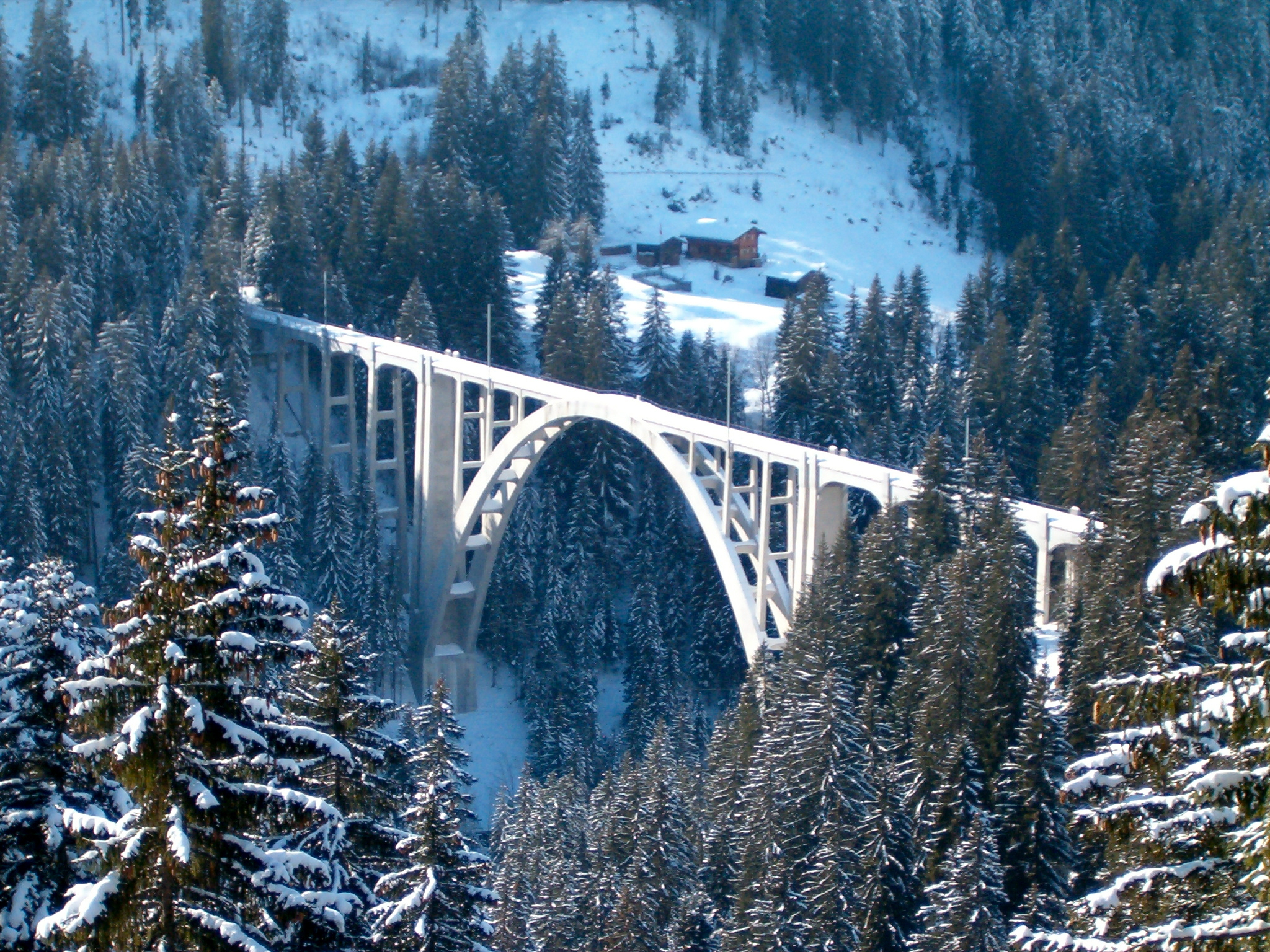
View from the southeast

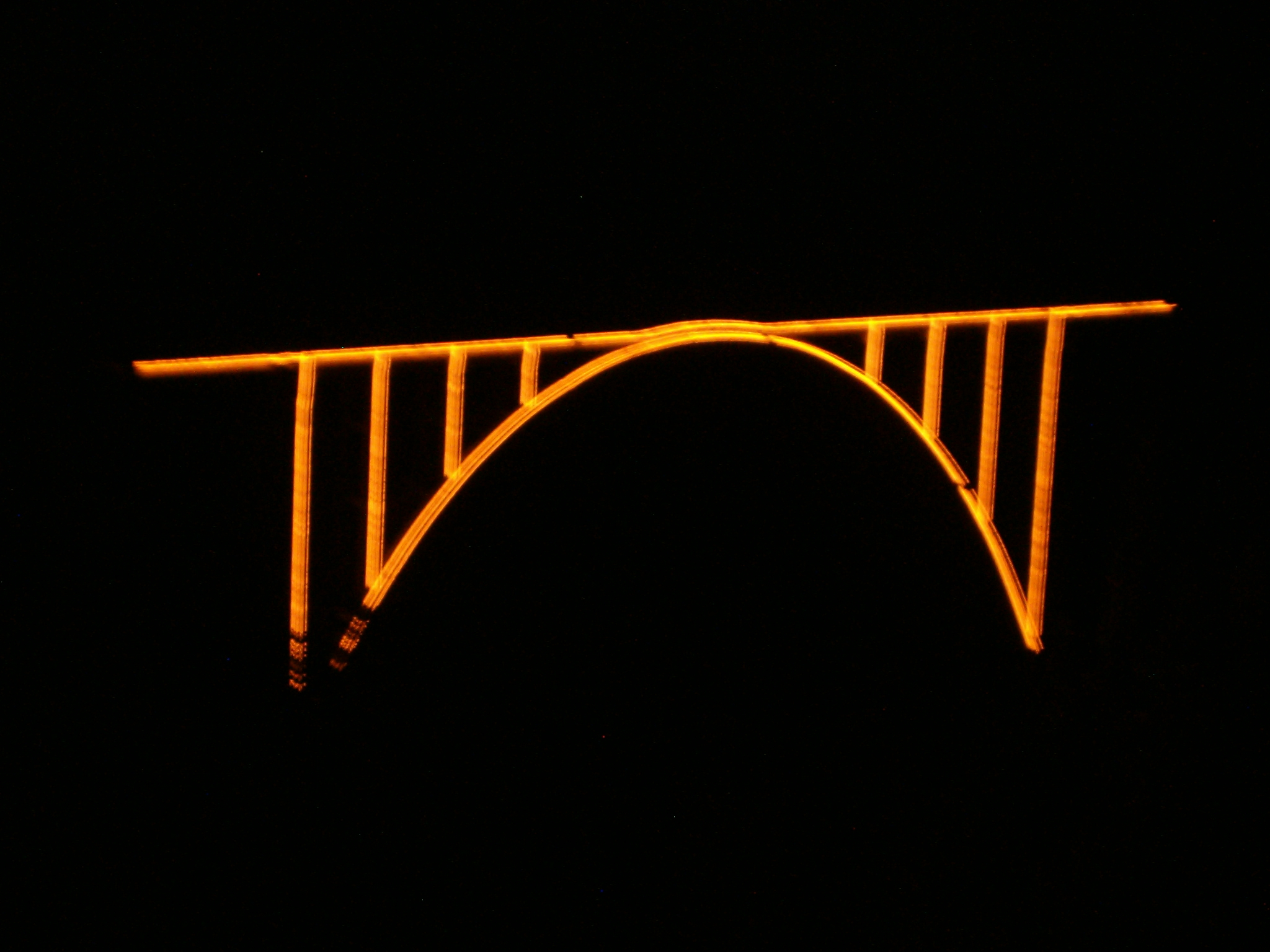
By night

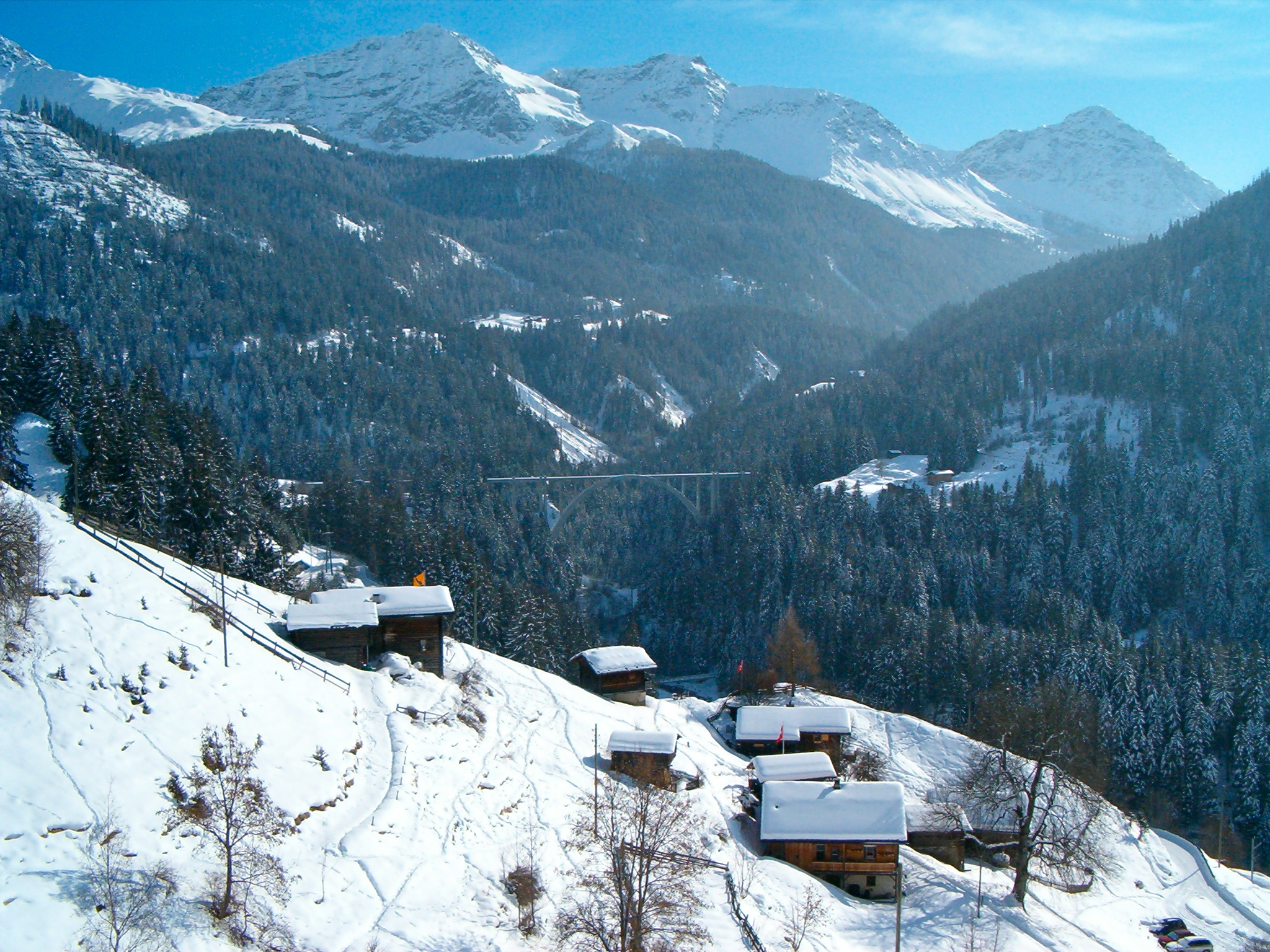
Seen from the saddle (NW)

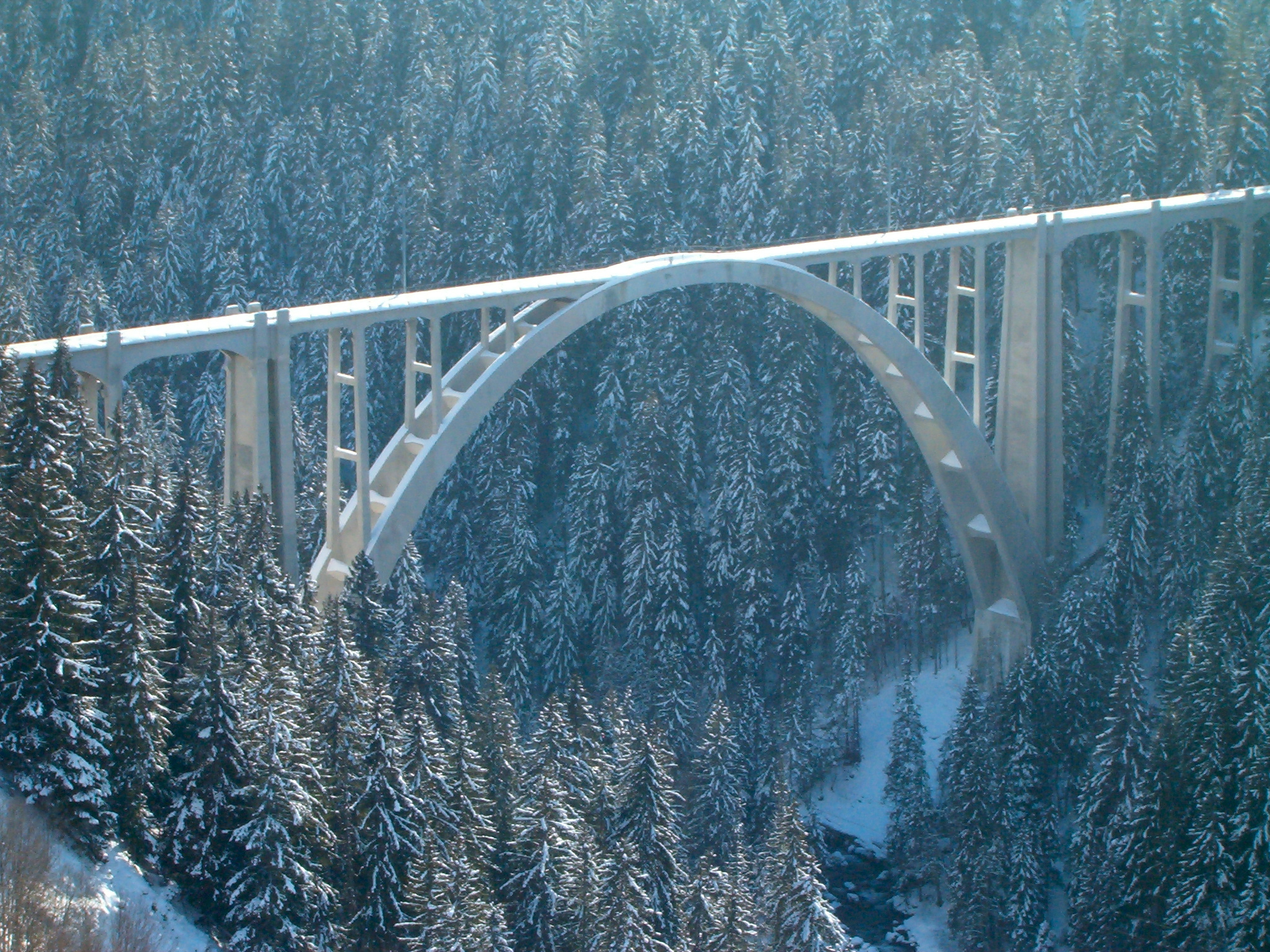
Another view, in the snow, showing its concrete build

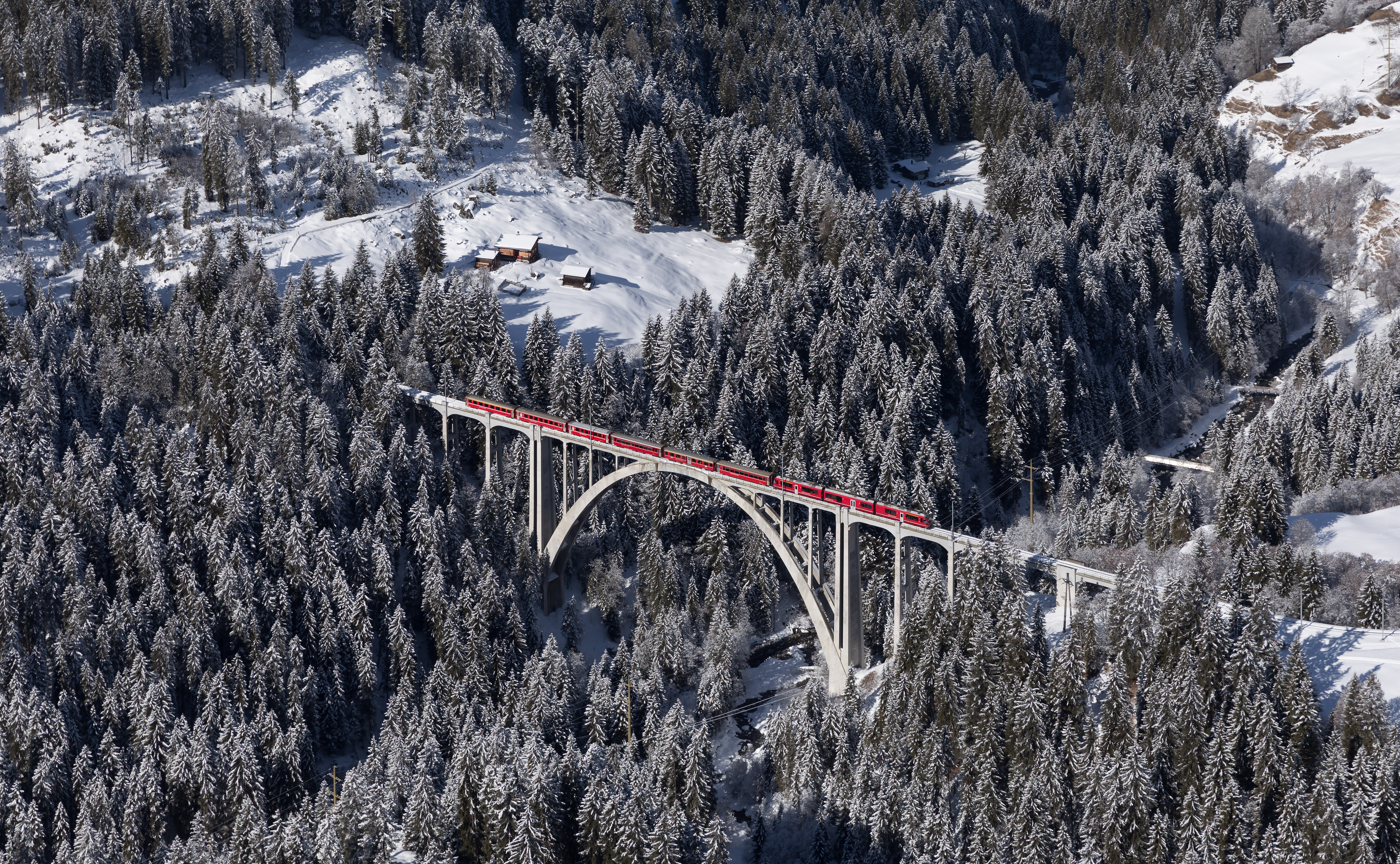
Aerial view showing the surrounding forests

== See also ==
- Arch bridge
- Viaduct
- Langwies (Rhaetian Railway station)
- Gründjitobel Viaduct
- Chur–Arosa railway
- Rhaetian Railway
