= Litzirüti =

Village in Graubünden, Switzerland

Coordinates: 46.799°N 9.703°E

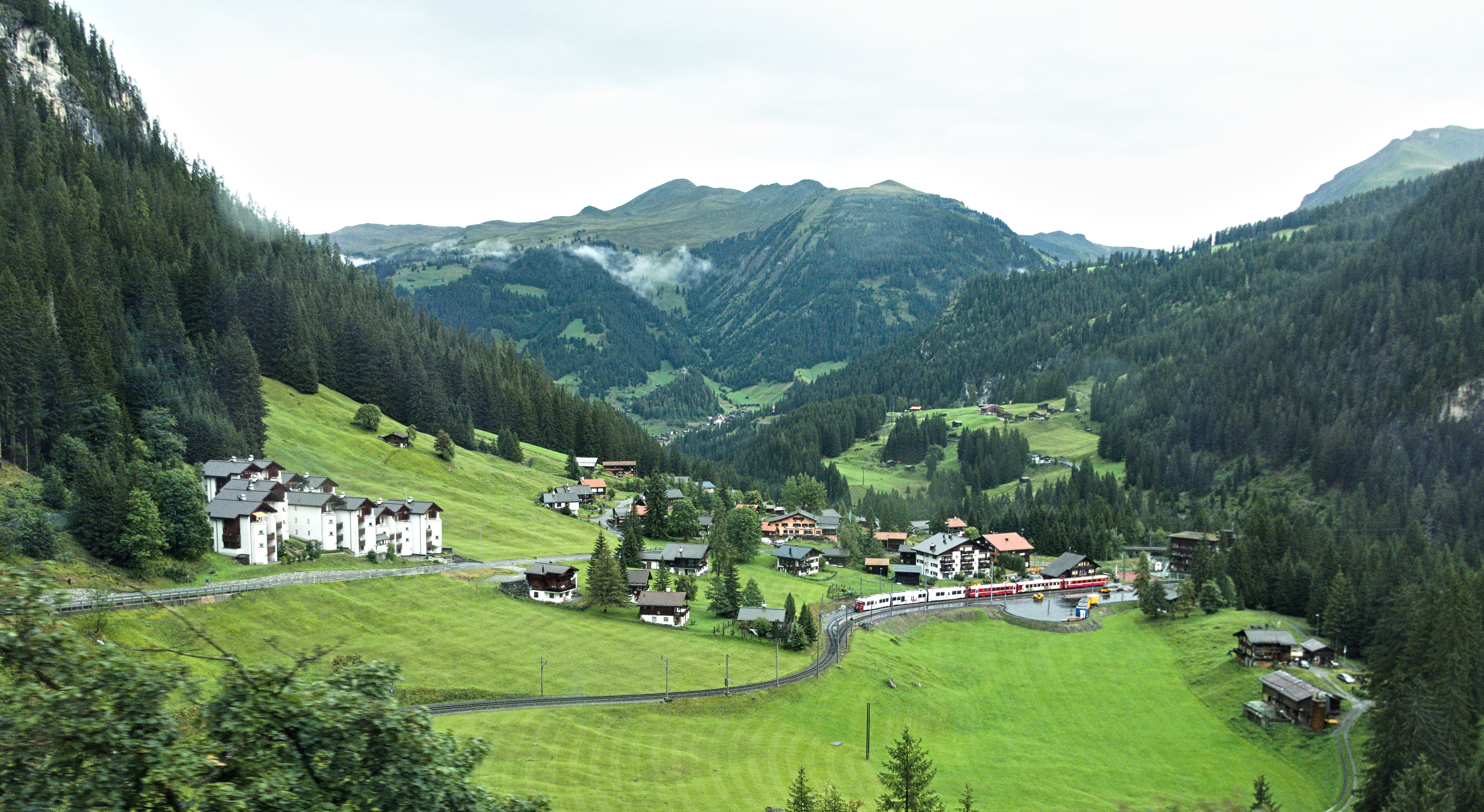
Litzirüti

Litzirüti is a small village near Langwies, in the municipality of Arosa, canton of Graubünden, Switzerland.

The village effectively forms part of the Arosa (summer & winter) resort. The elevation is roughly 1,452 metres (4,764 ft).

There is a railway station at Litzirüti, on the Chur-Arosa railway line: Litzirüti.

The postal code is 7058.
