= Langwies GR railway station =

Railway station in Switzerland

Langwies GR
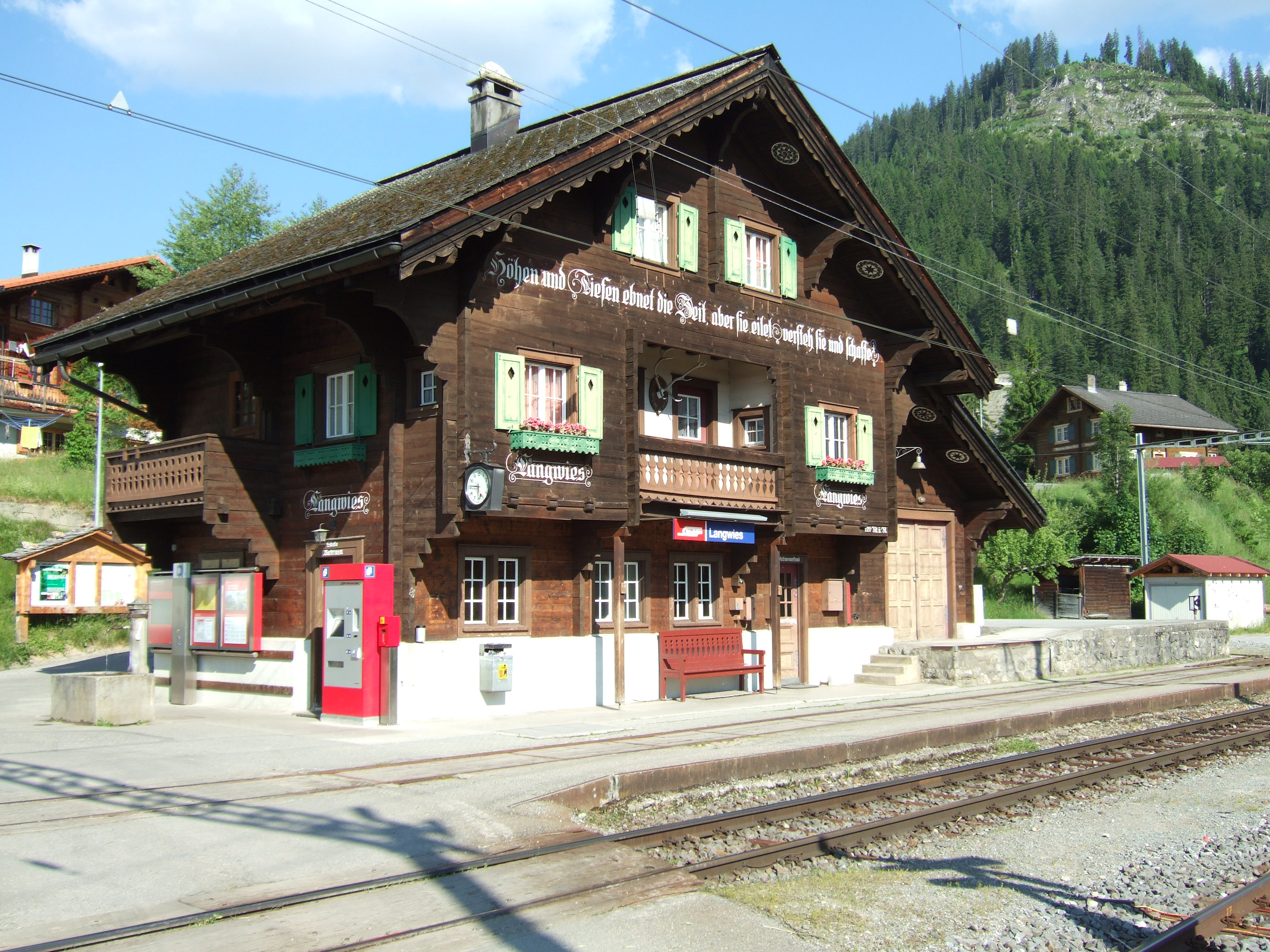
- The station building and main platform in 2010

General information
- Location: Arosa; Switzerland
- Coordinates: 46°49′10″N 9°42′26″E
- Elevation: 1,317 m (4,321 ft)
- Owner: Rhaetian Railway (since 1942); Chur-Arosa-Bahn (1914-1942)
- Line: Chur–Arosa line
- Distance: 17.900 kilometres (11.123 mi) from Chur
- Platforms: 2
- Train operators: Rhaetian Railway
- Connections: Local buses

Construction
- Architect: Alfons Rocco (1914)

History
- Opened: 12 December 1914

Services
Preceding station	Rhaetian Railway	Following station
Chur Altstadt towards Chur	RE 6	Litzirüti towards Arosa
Peist towards Chur	R 16	Litzirüti towards Arosa
Location

Langwies GR railway station, often just Langweis railway station, is a railway station on the Chur–Arosa railway (the "Arosabahn") of the Rhaetian Railway (RhB). It is situated in Langwies, lower down the hillside from the centre of the village. A minor level crossing straddles the tracks at the station.

== Viaducts ==
Two notable railway viaducts (or bridges) carry the line over deep valleys near to Langwies. Down the line (towards Chur) is the Gründjitobel Viaduct (or Gründjitobel Bridge; German: Gründjitobel-Viadukt) which is 145m long, and a short distance up the line is the Langwieser Viaduct (or Langwies Viaduct; German: Langwieser Viadukt).

The latter viaduct is listed as a Swiss heritage site of national significance. It is 284m long (though some sources state it as 287m) and, like the former viaduct, is a pioneering reinforced concrete structure.

== Services ==
As of the December 2023 timetable change, the following services stop at Langwies GR:

- RegioExpress: four round-trips per day between Chur and Arosa
- Regio: hourly service between Chur and Arosa.

== Gallery ==
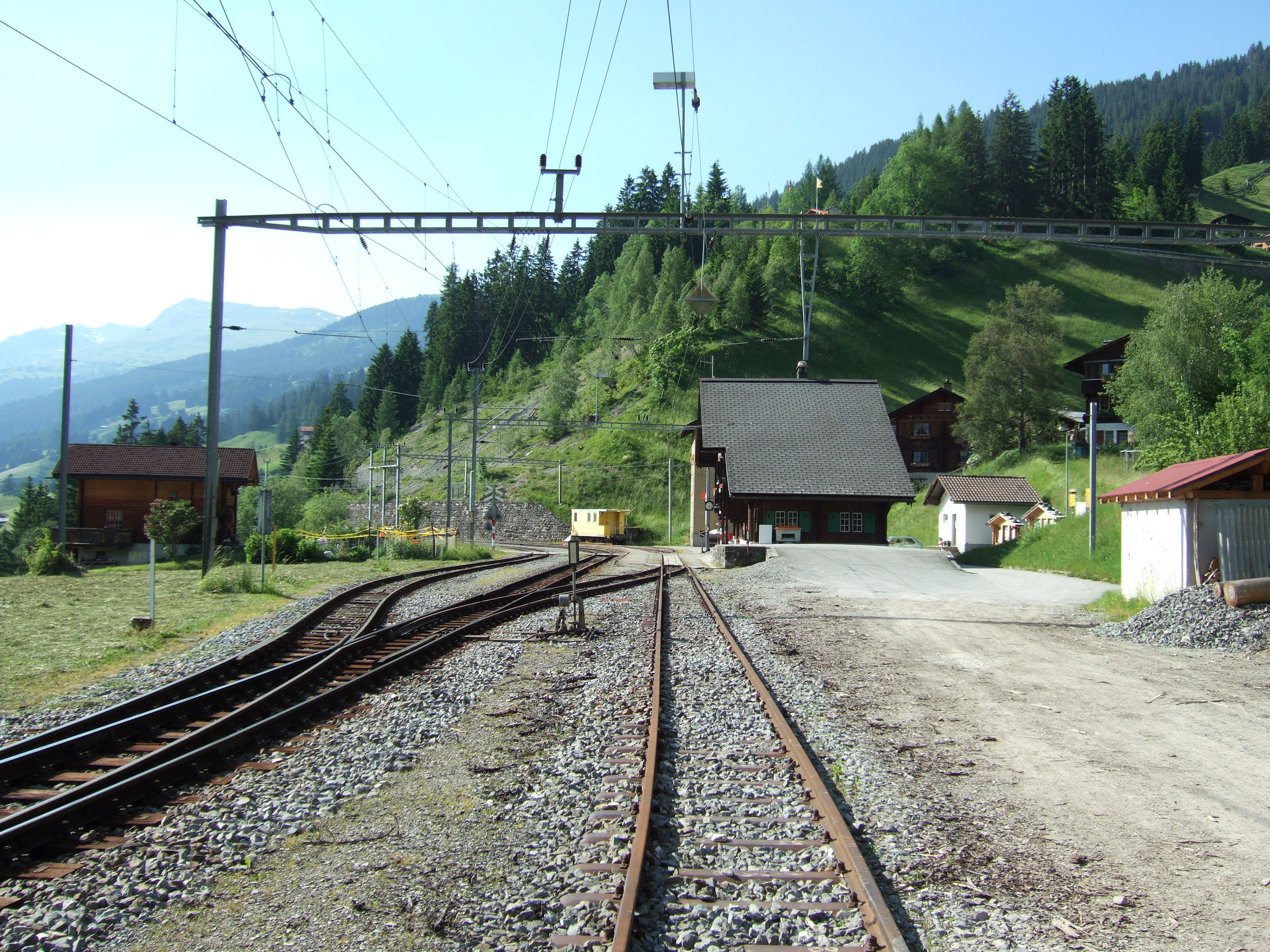
The station and its tracks, looking down the line

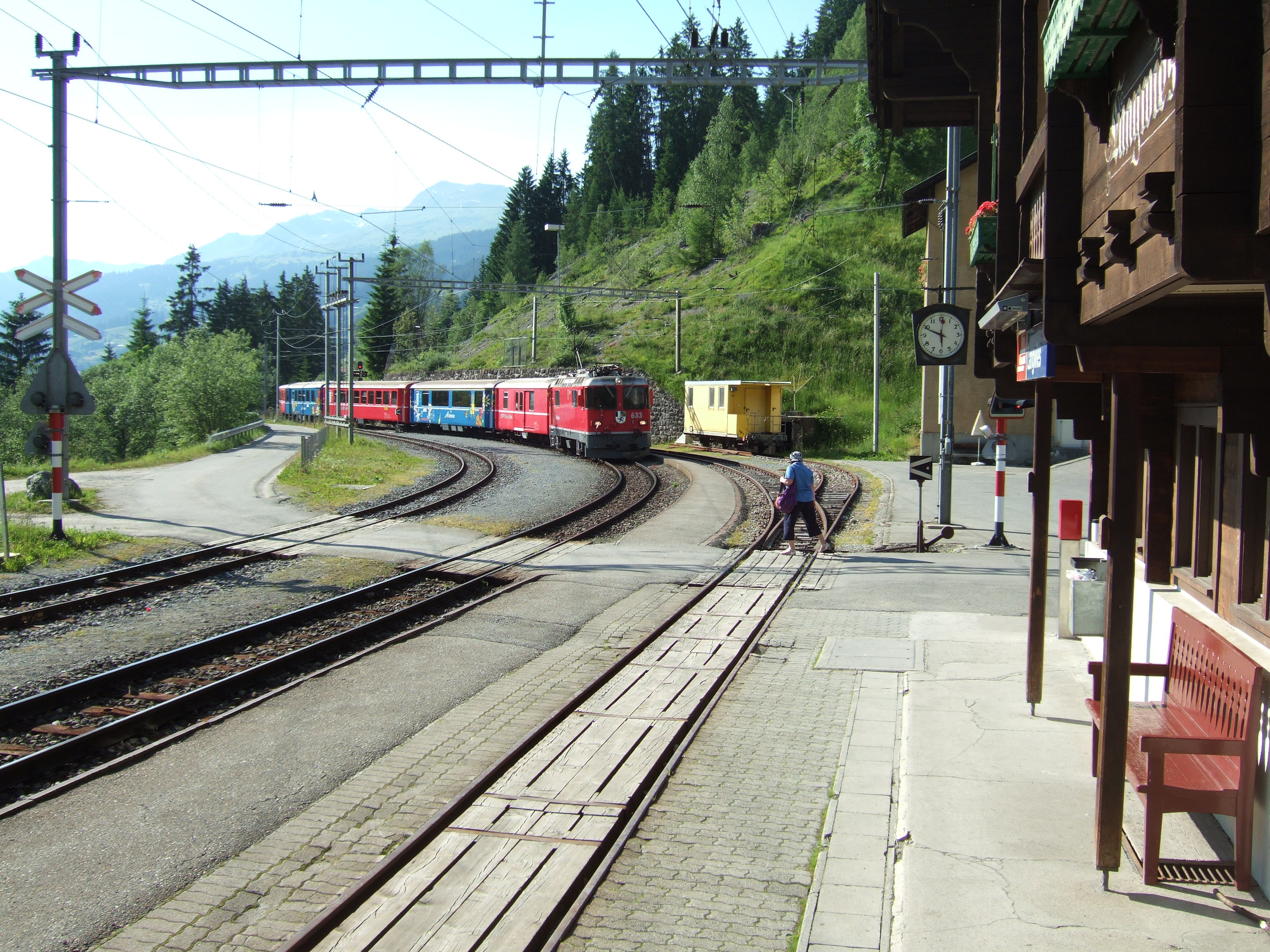
A train approaches the station - note the level crossing

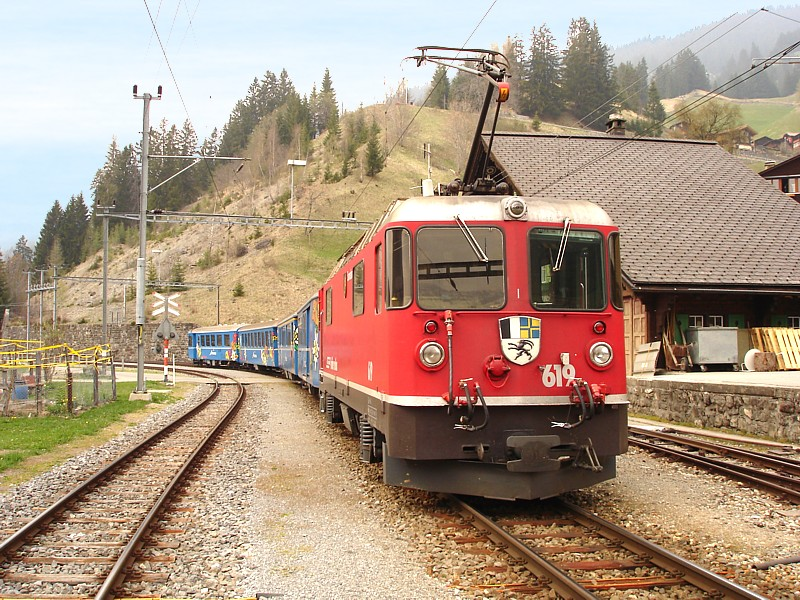
A train runs through Langwies

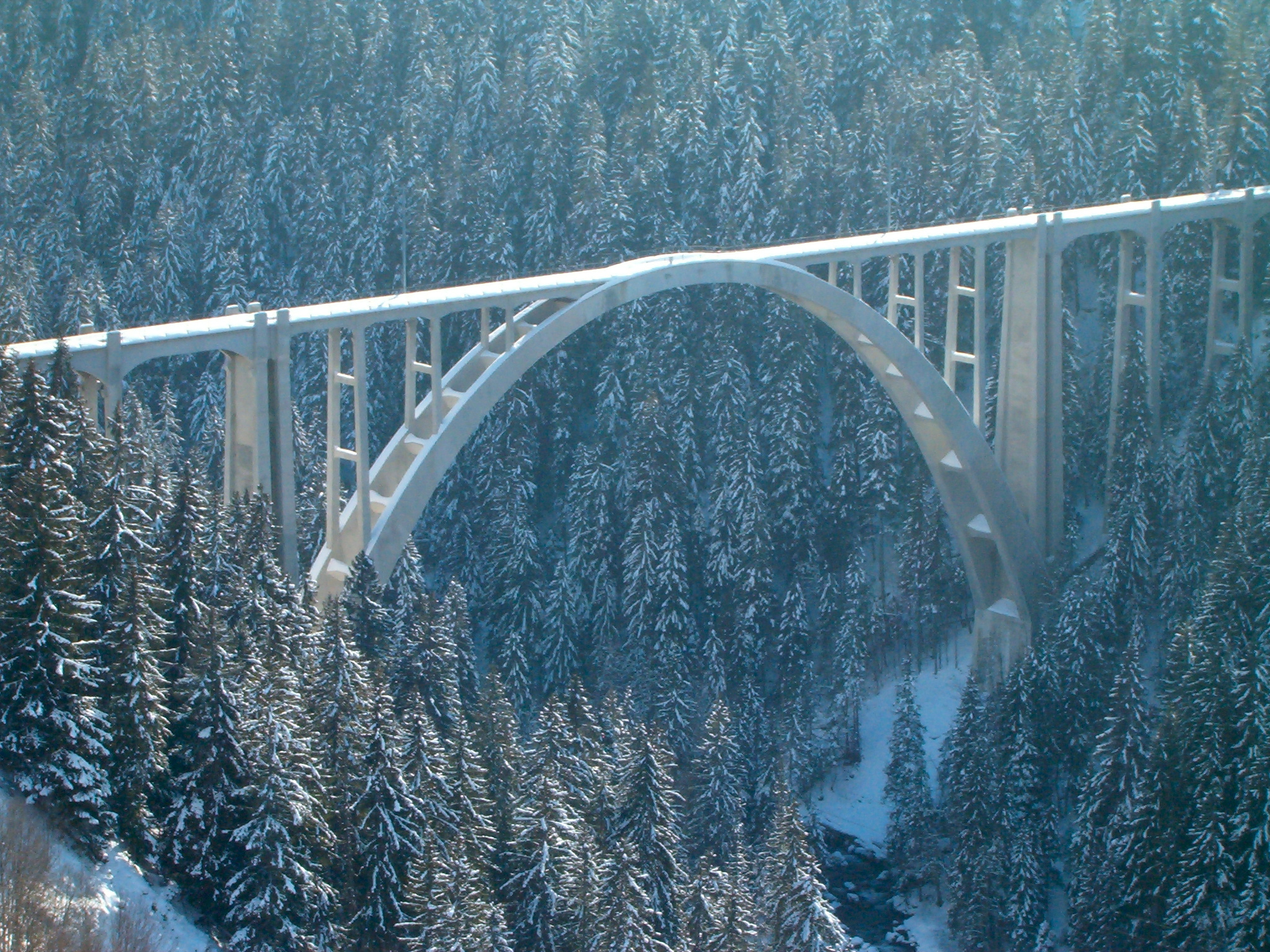
Langwieser Viaduct

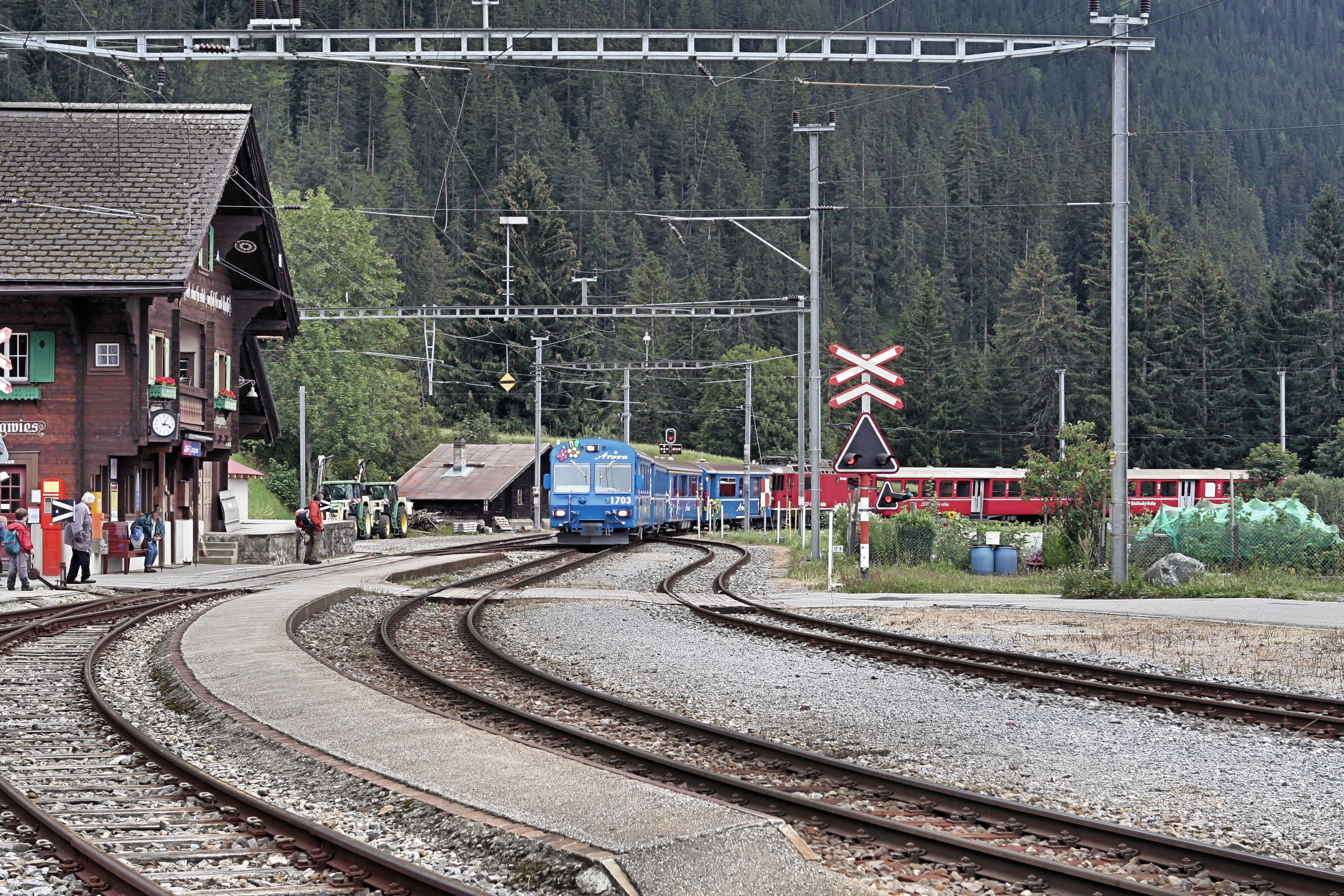
Langwies station, looking up the line

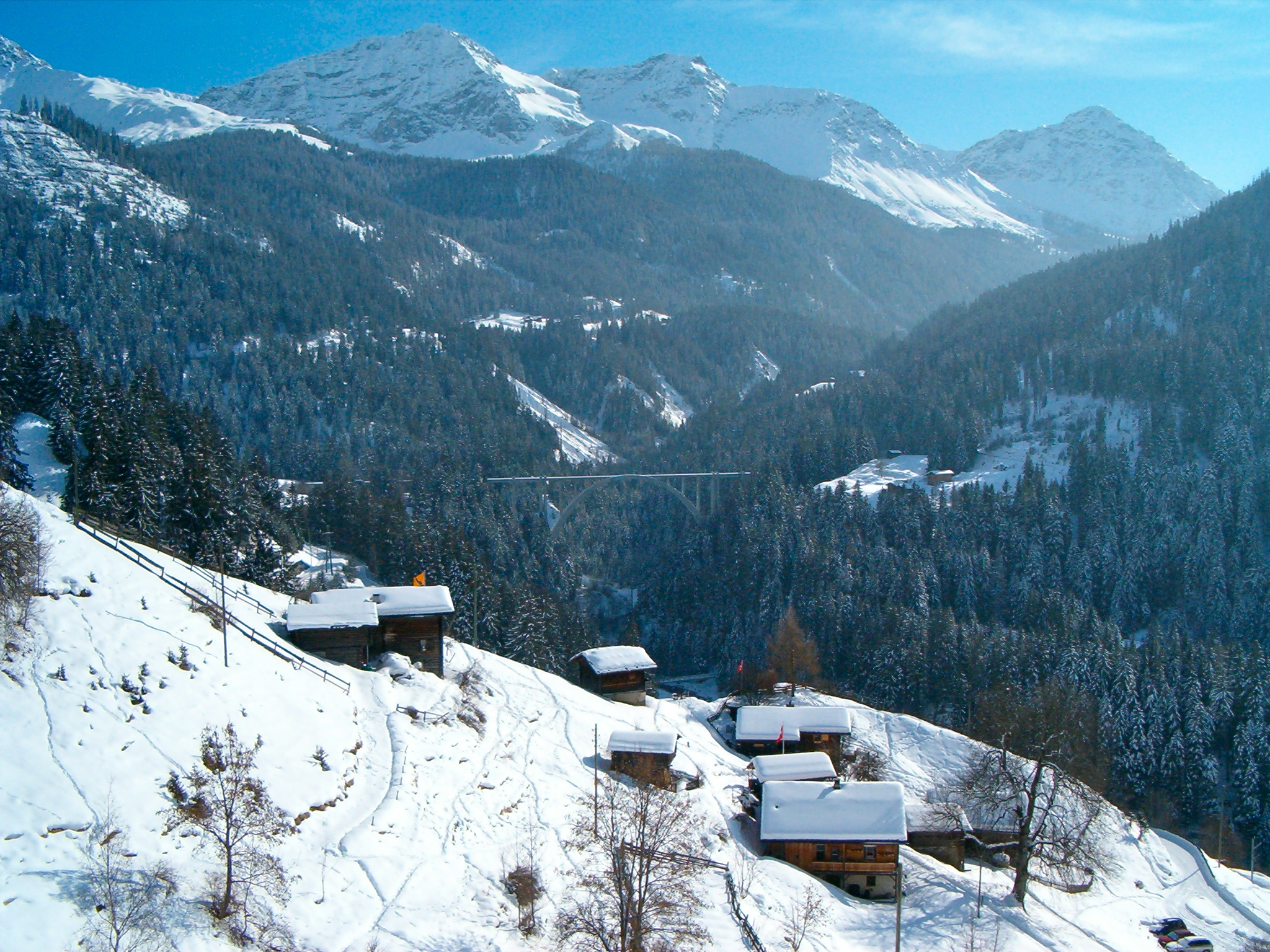
Another view of the Viaduct
