= Langwies =

- Former municipality
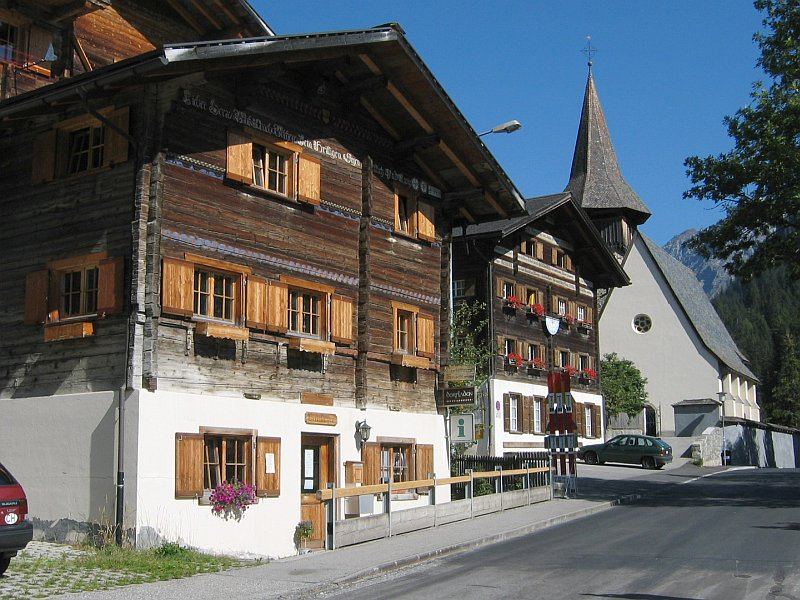

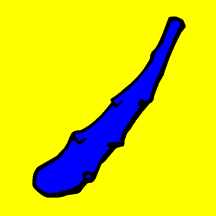
- Flag Coat of arms
- Location of Langwies
- Location within Switzerland Location within Canton of Graubünden
- Coordinates: 46°49′N 9°43′E
- Country: Switzerland
- Canton: Graubünden
- District: Plessur

Area
  - Total: 54.85 km^{2} (21.18 sq mi)
- Elevation: 1,377 m (4,518 ft)

Population (2010)
  - Total: 292
  - Density: 5.32/km^{2} (13.8/sq mi)
- Time zone: UTC+01:00 (CET)
  - Summer (DST): UTC+02:00 (CEST)
- Postal code: 7057
- SFOS number: 3924
- ISO 3166 code: CH-GR
- Surrounded by: Arosa, Conters im Prättigau, Davos, Fideris, Klosters-Serneus, Peist
- Website: www.gemeindelangwies.ch

Langwies is a former municipality in the district of Plessur in the canton of Graubünden in Switzerland. On 1 January 2013 the former municipalities of Langwies, Calfreisen, Castiel, Lüen, Molinis, Peist and St. Peter-Pagig merged into the municipality of Arosa.

== History ==
Langwies is first mentioned in 1384 as die lang Wise.

== Geography ==
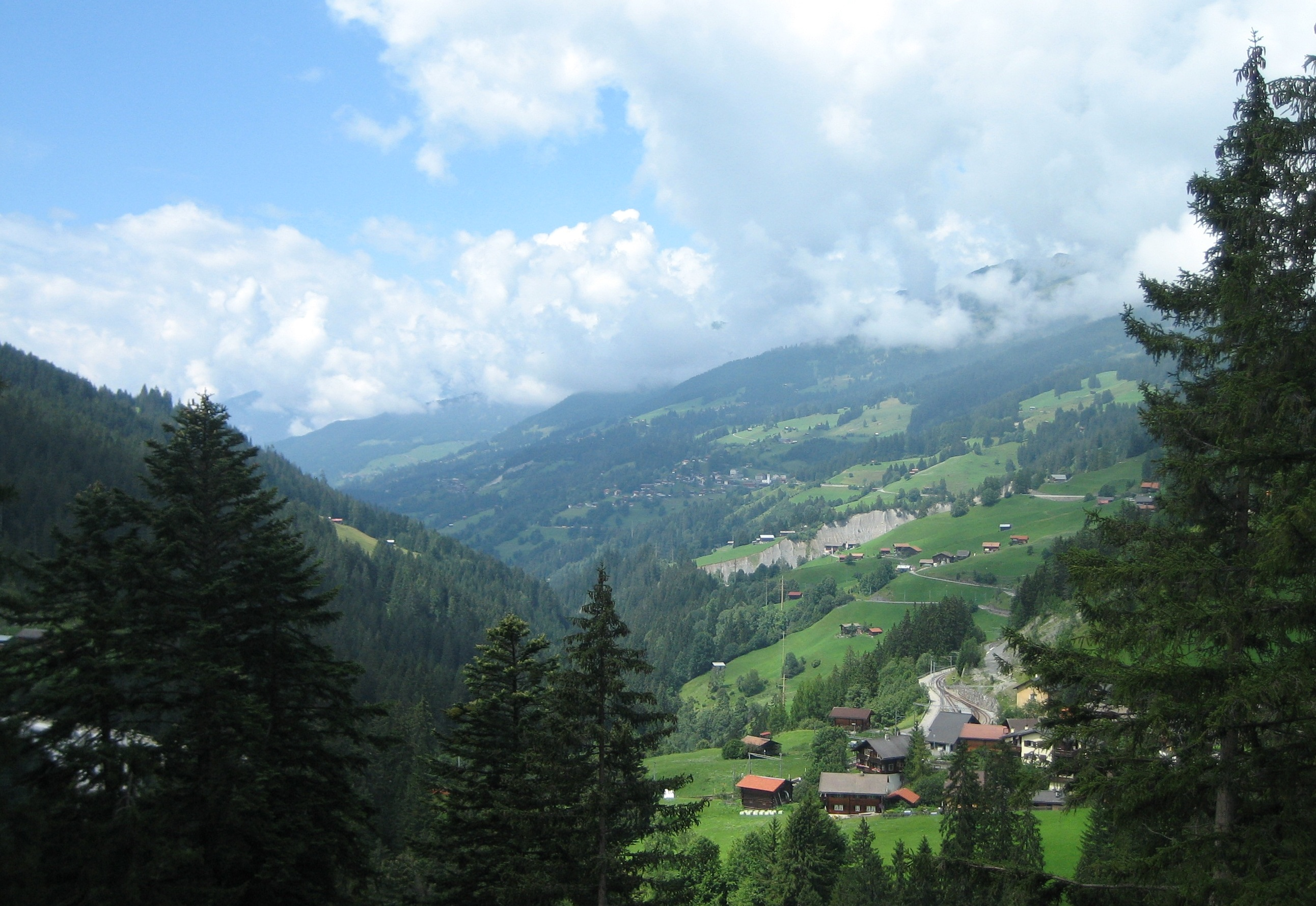
Langwies valley

Before the merger, Langwies had a total area of 54.9 km^{2} (21.2 mi^{2}). Of this area, 48.8% is used for agricultural purposes, while 22.6% is forested. Of the rest of the land, 1.2% is settled (buildings or roads) and the remainder (27.5%) is non-productive (rivers, glaciers or mountains).

The former municipality is located in the Schanfigg sub-district of the Plessur district. It is located on the shortest route between Chur and Davos which is over the Strela pass. It consists of the village of Langwies and the hamlets of Platz, Litzirüti, Fondei and Sapün.

On the south-western edge of the village of Langwies, and lower down the hillside from the centre, is the Langwies railway station, on the Chur-Arosa railway line. Additionally, in the hamlet of Litzirüti is the Litzirüti railway station.

== Demographics ==
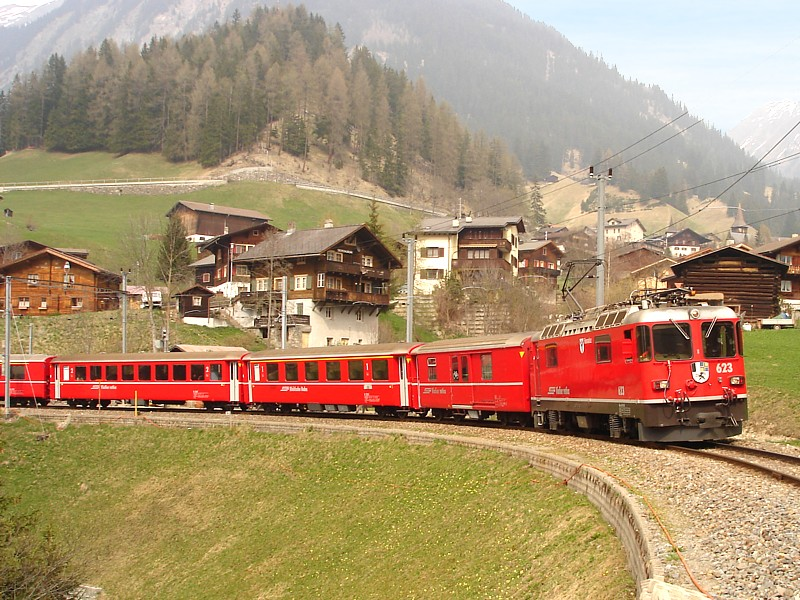
A train heads up the line at Langwies

Aerial view from 1800 m by Walter Mittelholzer (1928)

Langwies had a population (as of 2010) of 292. As of 2008, 6.8% of the population was made up of foreign nationals. Over the last 10 years the population has decreased at a rate of -6.1%. Most of the population (as of 2000) speaks German (97.0%), with Romansh being second most common ( 0.7%) and Dutch being third ( 0.7%).

As of 2000, the gender distribution of the population was 48.1% male and 51.9% female. The age distribution, as of 2000, in Langwies is; 30 children or 9.9% of the population are between 0 and 9 years old and 34 teenagers or 11.2% are between 10 and 19. Of the adult population, 18 people or 5.9% of the population are between 20 and 29 years old. 48 people or 15.8% are between 30 and 39, 39 people or 12.9% are between 40 and 49, and 48 people or 15.8% are between 50 and 59. The senior population distribution is 42 people or 13.9% of the population are between 60 and 69 years old, 31 people or 10.2% are between 70 and 79, there are 10 people or 3.3% who are between 80 and 89, and there are 3 people or 1.0% who are between 90 and 99.

In the 2007 federal election the most popular party was the SVP which received 64.8% of the vote. The next three most popular parties were the SP (24.4%), the FDP (4.8%) and the CVP (4.8%).

In Langwies about 76.7% of the population (between age 25-64) have completed either non-mandatory upper secondary education or additional higher education (either university or a Fachhochschule).

Langwies has an unemployment rate of 0.83%. As of 2005, there were 48 people employed in the primary economic sector and about 21 businesses involved in this sector. 4 people are employed in the secondary sector and there are 2 businesses in this sector. 76 people are employed in the tertiary sector.

The historical population is given in the following table:

year	population
1623	c. 670
1850	358
1900	285
1950	383
1980	286
2000	303

== Heritage sites of national significance ==
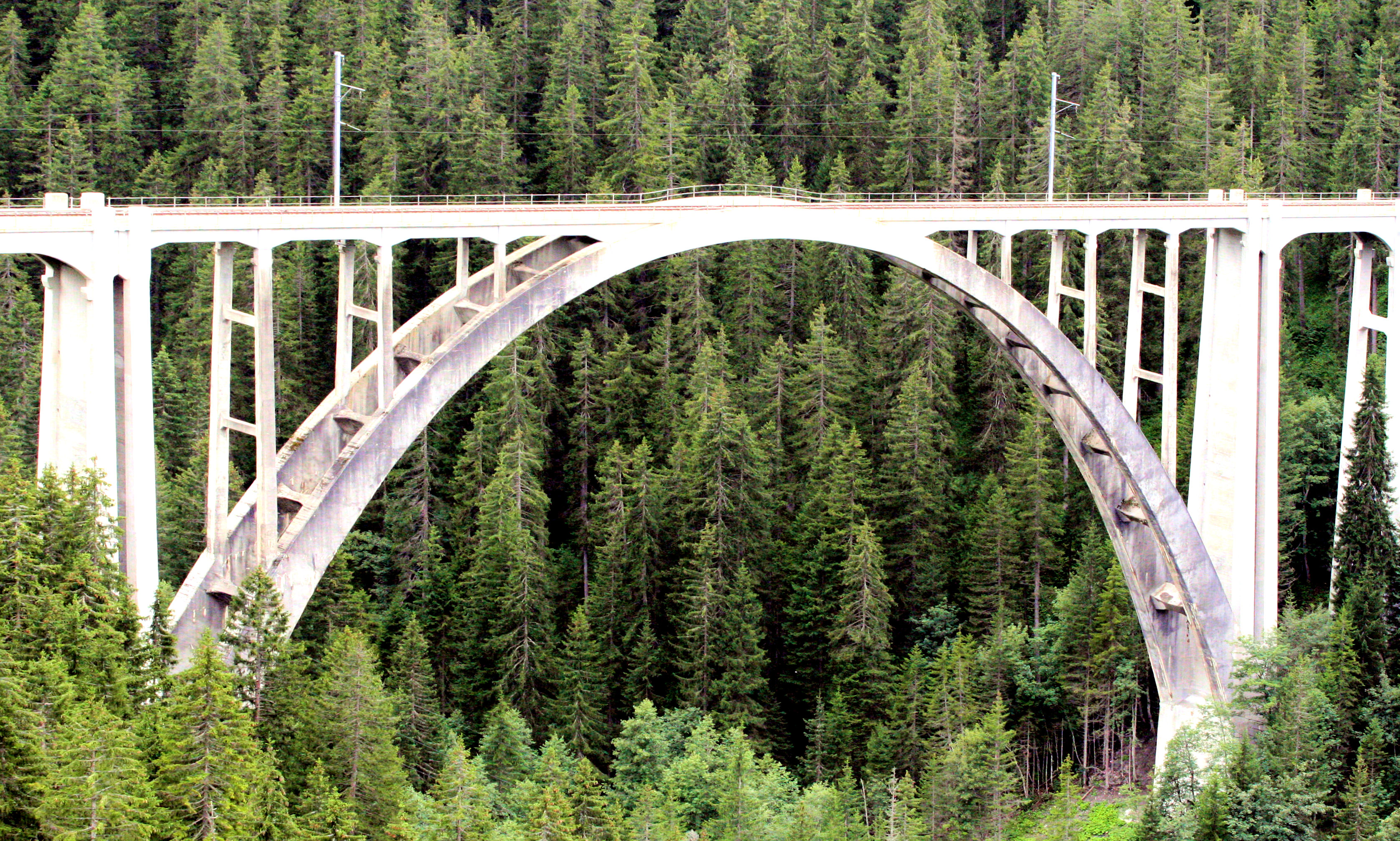
Langwieser Viaduct

The Langwieser Viaduct for the Rhätische Bahn is listed as a Swiss heritage site of national significance.
