= Litzirüti railway station =

Railway station in Switzerland

Litzirüti
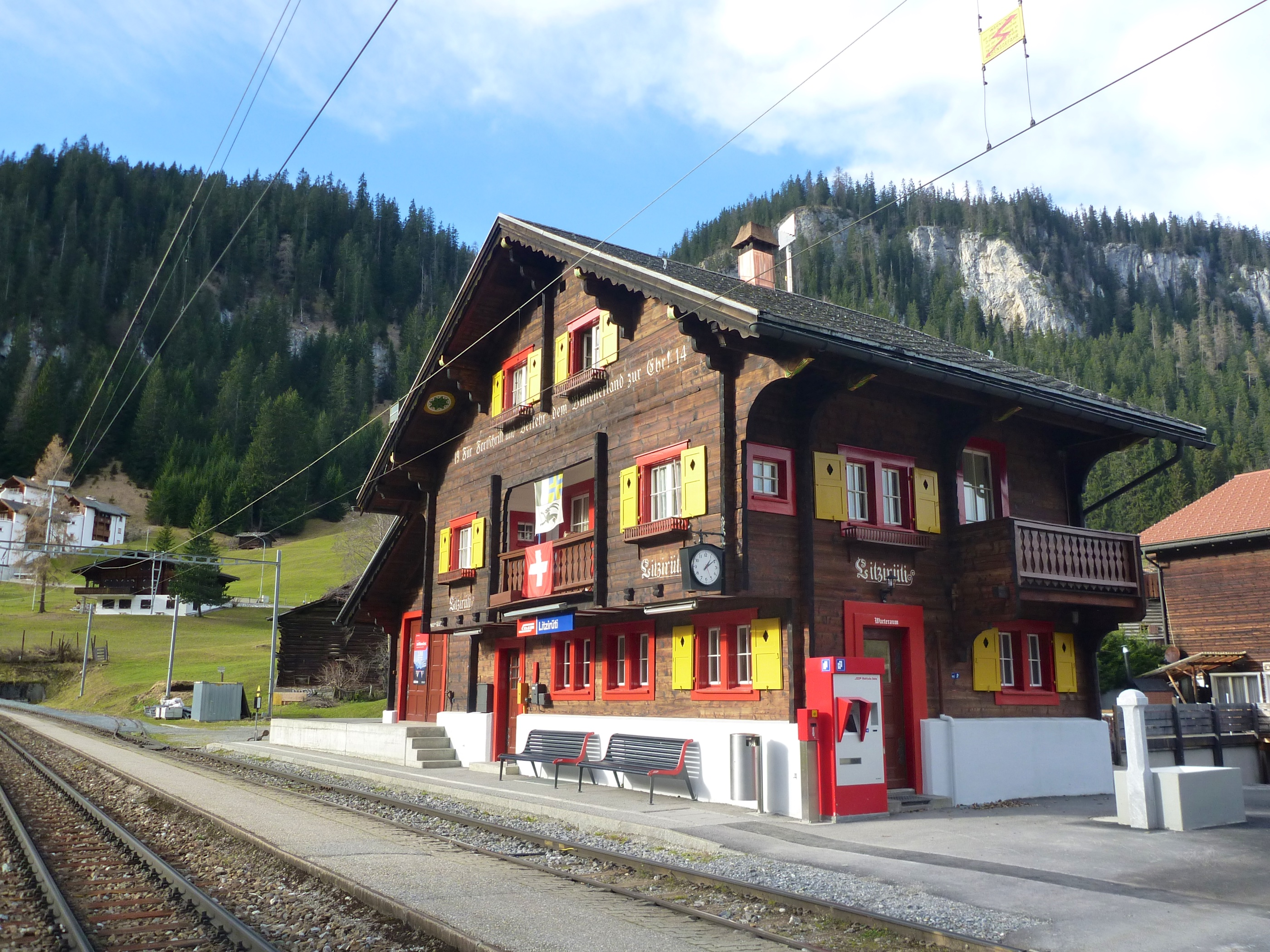
- The station building in 2014

General information
- Location: Arosa; Switzerland
- Coordinates: 46°47′52″N 9°42′12″E
- Elevation: 1,452 m (4,764 ft)
- Owner: Rhaetian Railway (since 1942); Chur-Arosa-Bahn (1914-1942)
- Line: Chur–Arosa line
- Distance: 20.685 kilometres (12.853 mi) from Chur
- Platforms: 2
- Train operators: Rhaetian Railway
- Connections: Local buses

Construction
- Architect: Alfons Rocco (1914)

History
- Opened: 12 December 1914

Services
Preceding station	Rhaetian Railway	Following station
Langwies GR towards Chur	RE 6	Arosa Terminus
Langwies GR towards Chur	R 16	Arosa Terminus
Location

Litzirüti railway station is a railway station on the Chur–Arosa railway (the "Arosabahn") of the Rhaetian Railway (RhB). It is situated in the hamlet of Litzirüti.

The station has a small café on the Arosa end of the main platform.

== Services ==
As of the December 2023 timetable change, the following services stop at Litzirüti:

- RegioExpress: four round-trips per day between Chur and Arosa
- Regio: hourly service between Chur and Arosa.
