= Rabiosa (river) =

River in Switzerland

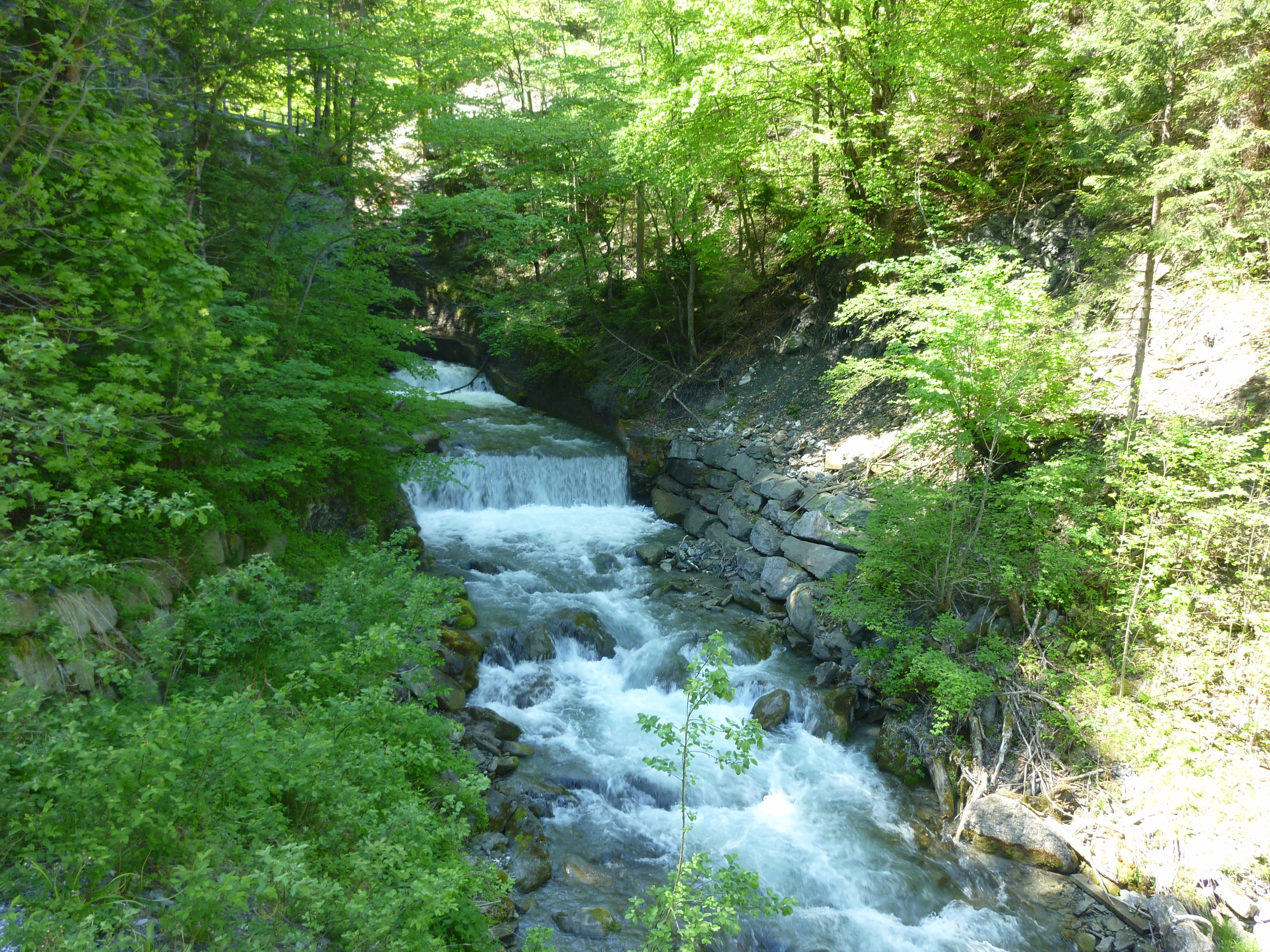
- The Rabiosa

Location
- Location: Canton of Grisons, Switzerland
- Reference no.: CH: 321

Physical characteristics
- Source
  - location: Am Fulhorn
  - coordinates: 46°46′14″N 9°30′23″E
- Mouth
  - location: Near Meiersboden into the Plessur
  - coordinates: 46°50′06″N 9°32′46″E
- Length: 7.9 km
- Basin size: 52.6 km^{2}

Basin features
- Progression: Plessur→ Rhine→ North Sea

The Rabiosa, also called the Rabiusa or, on in the municipality of Malix, the Landwasser (Alemannic), is a 7.9-kilometre-long, left-hand tributary of the Plessur in the Swiss Canton of Grisons.
