= Plessur (river) =

River in Switzerland

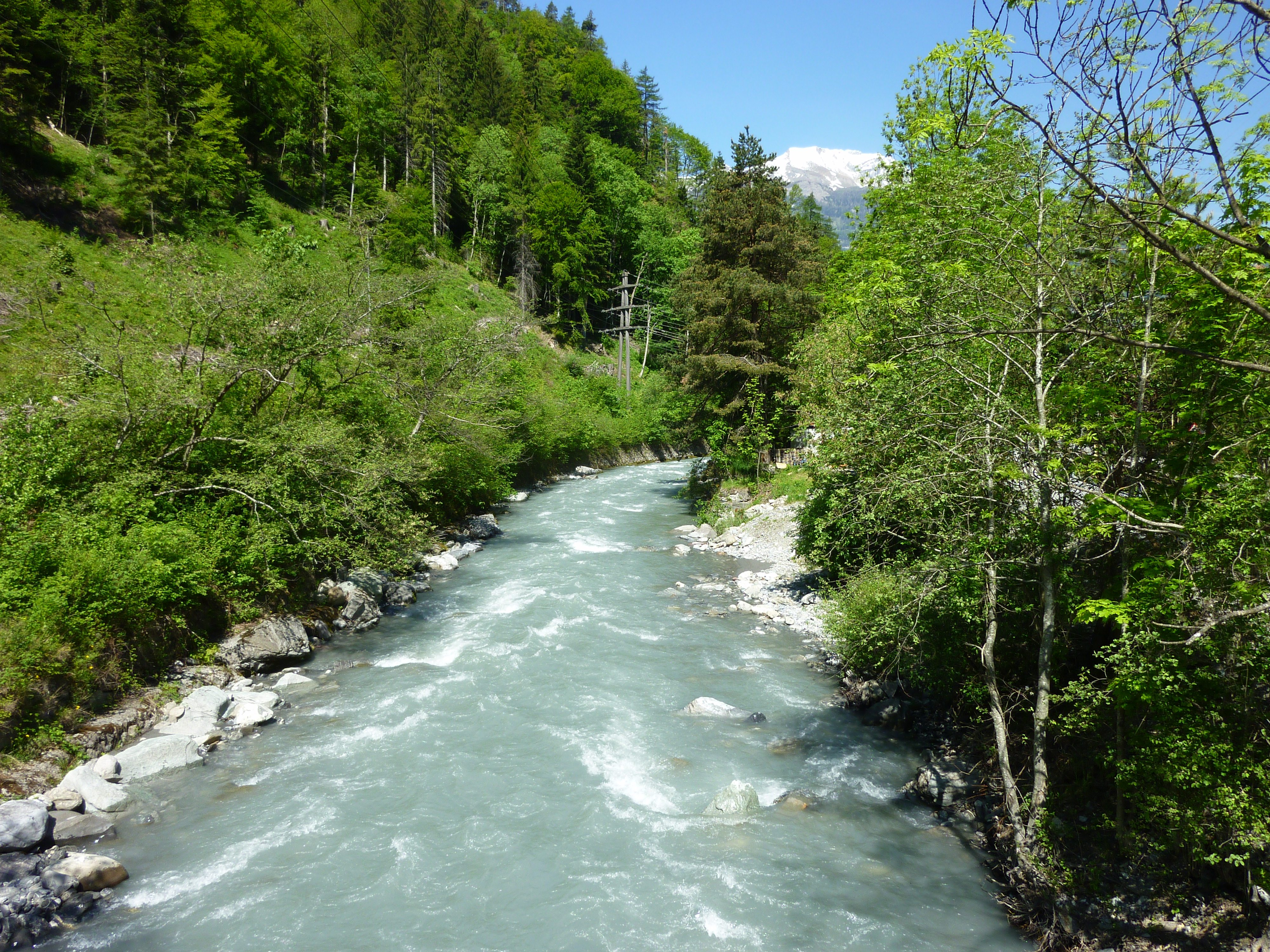
- The Plessur above Chur.

Physical characteristics
- Source
  - coordinates: 46°44′45.4″N 9°37′10″E
  - elevation: 2,400 m (7,900 ft)
- Mouth
  - coordinates: 46°51′46″N 9°30′26″E
  - elevation: 560 m (1,840 ft)
- Length: 33.1 km (20.6 mi)

Basin features
- Progression: Rhine→ North Sea

The Plessur is a river, 33 km (21 mi) long, and a right tributary of the Rhine running through the Swiss canton of Graubünden. Its head is near Arosa in the Plessur Range. It then flows through the Schanfigg valley before emptying into the Rhine at Chur.

The Langwieser Viaduct, an early reinforced concrete railway bridge constructed in 1914, spans the Plessur near Langwies.

Its main tributaries include the Rabiosa, the Welschtobelbach, Sapünerbach and Fondeierbach.

== See also ==
- List of rivers of Switzerland
