= Chur–Arosa railway line =

Railway line in Switzerland

Chur–Arosa
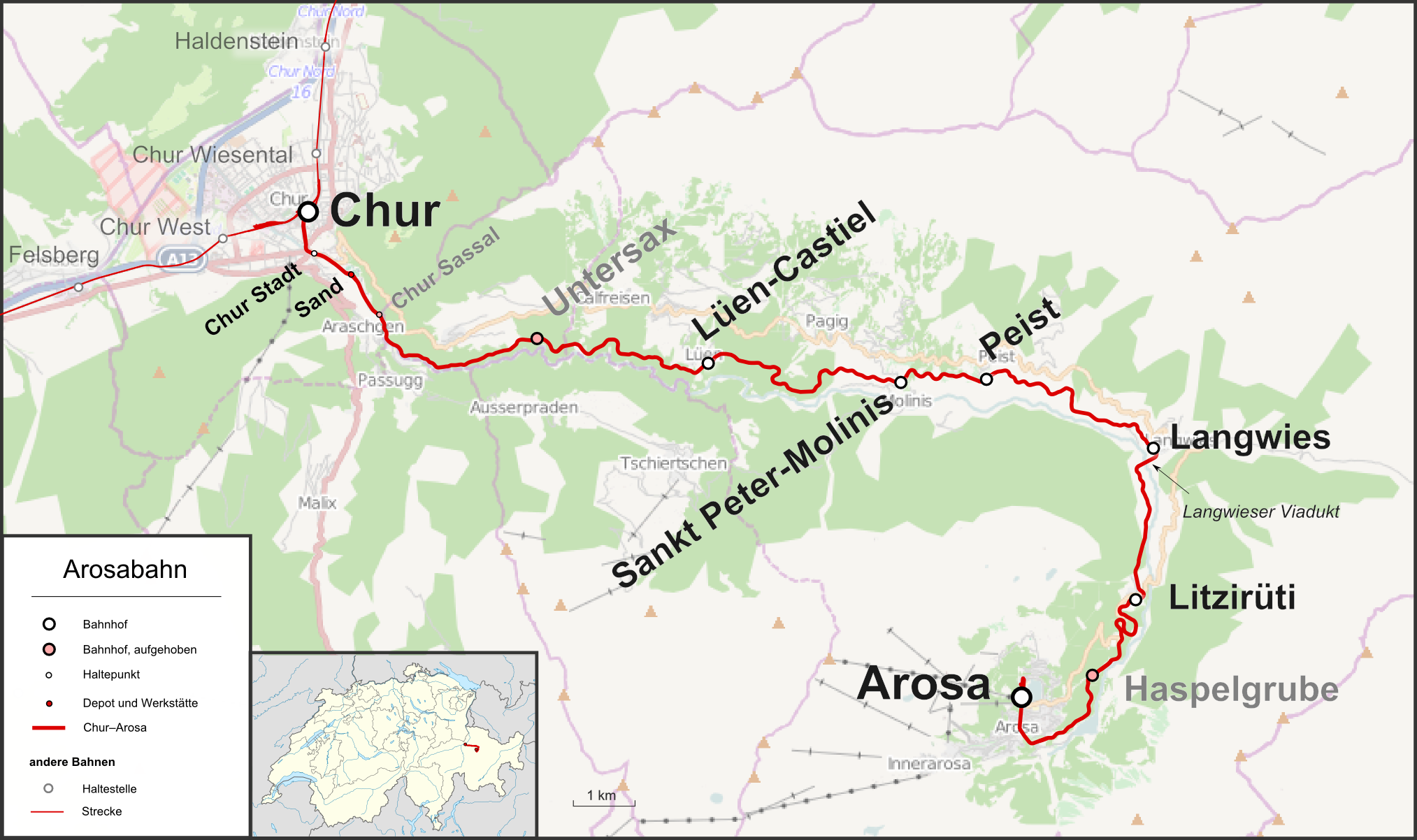

Overview
- Owner: Rhaetian Railway
- Line number: 930
- Termini: Chur; Arosa

Technical
- Line length: 25.681 km (15.957 mi)
- Number of tracks: Single track with passing loops
- Track gauge: 1,000 mm (3 ft 3 3/8 in) metre gauge
- Minimum radius: 60 m (200 ft)
- Electrification: 11 kV 16.7 Hz AC overhead catenary; 2400 V DC until 1997
- Operating speed: 35 km/h (22 mph)
- Maximum incline: 6.0%

The Chur–Arosa railway line, also called the Arosabahn, Arosalinie, Aroserbahn or Aroserlinie (all meaning Arosa railway or line), is a Swiss metre-gauge railway line, which is owned and operated by the Rhaetian Railway (German: Rhätische Bahn; RhB). It was built in 1914 by the Chur-Arosa-Bahn (lit. 'Chur-Arosa Railway'; ChA) to connect the Grisons capital, Chur, with the spa town of Arosa. Since 1942, it has been integrated into the network of the Rhaetian Railway. The name of the former company is still used as a name for the line.

== Route description ==
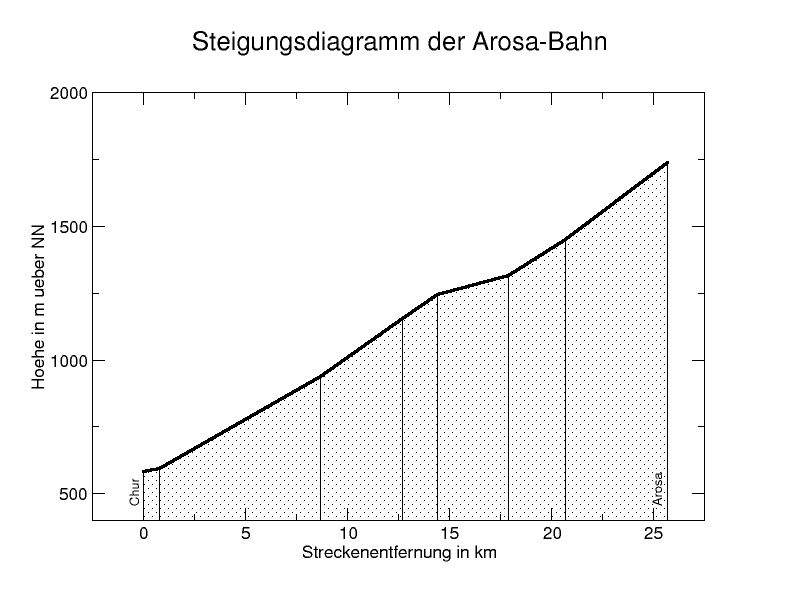
Gradient diagram

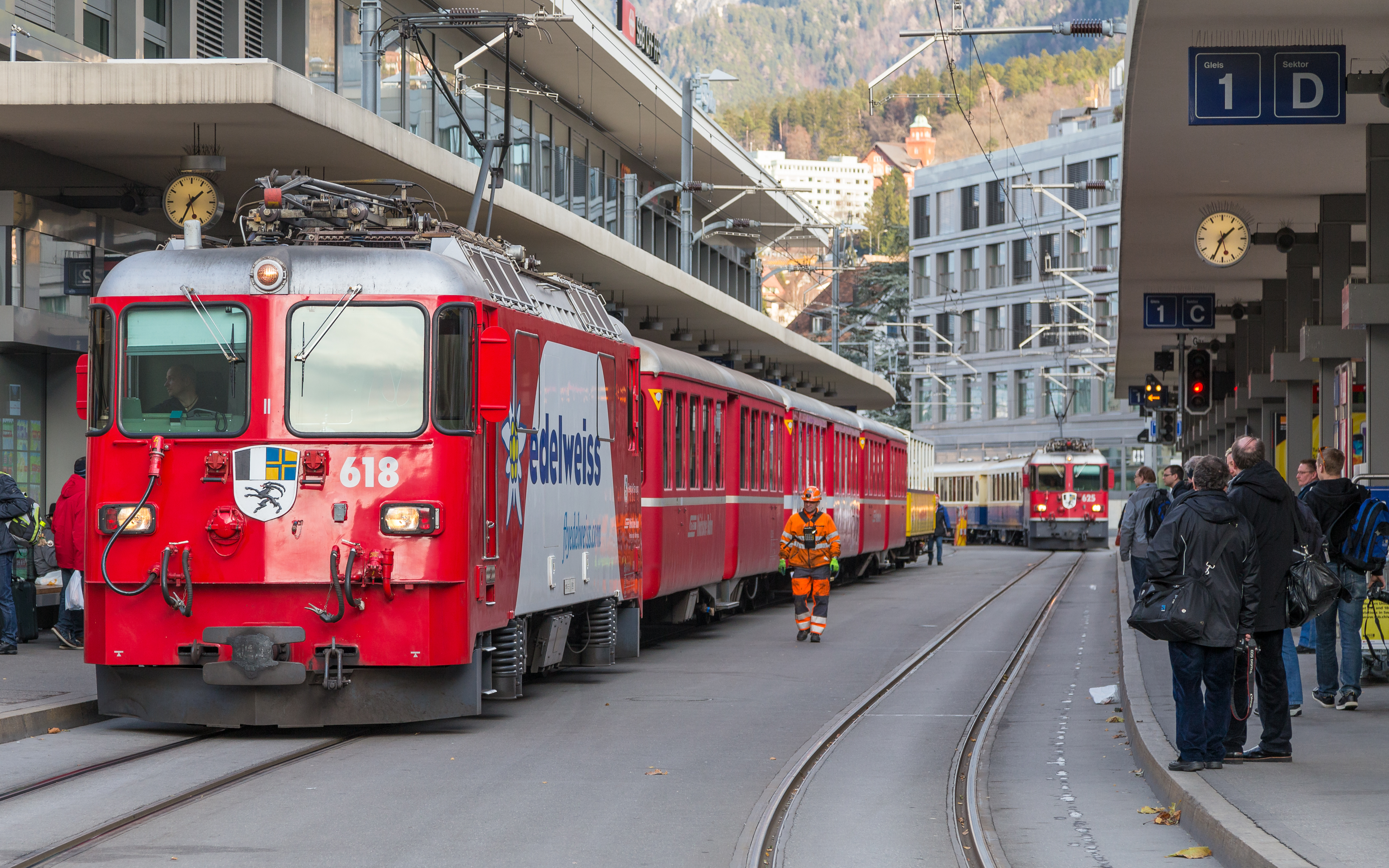
Starting at the station square in Chur

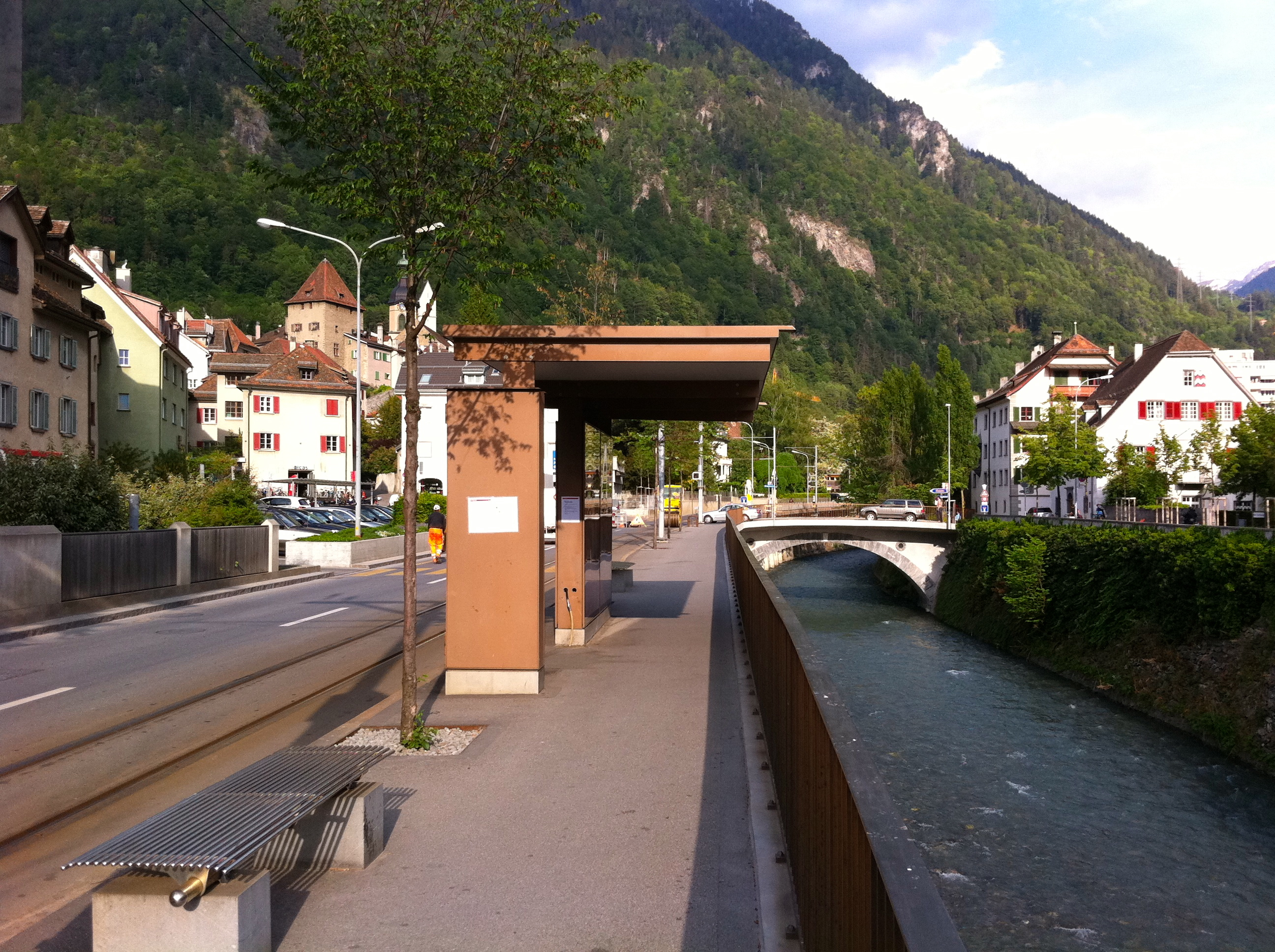
The halt of Chur Altstadt at Plessurquai

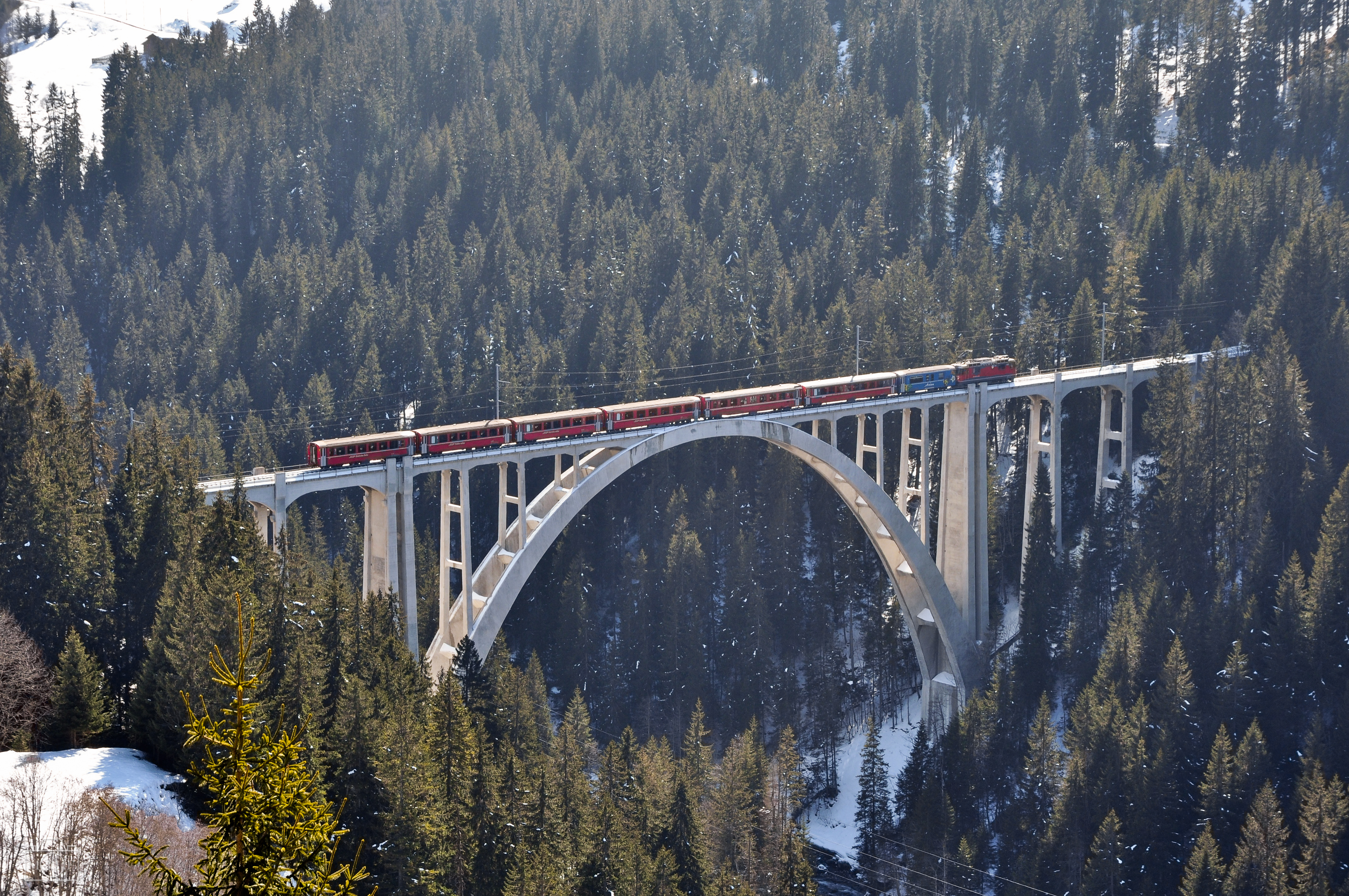
The Langwies Viaduct, the landmark of the Arosa Railway

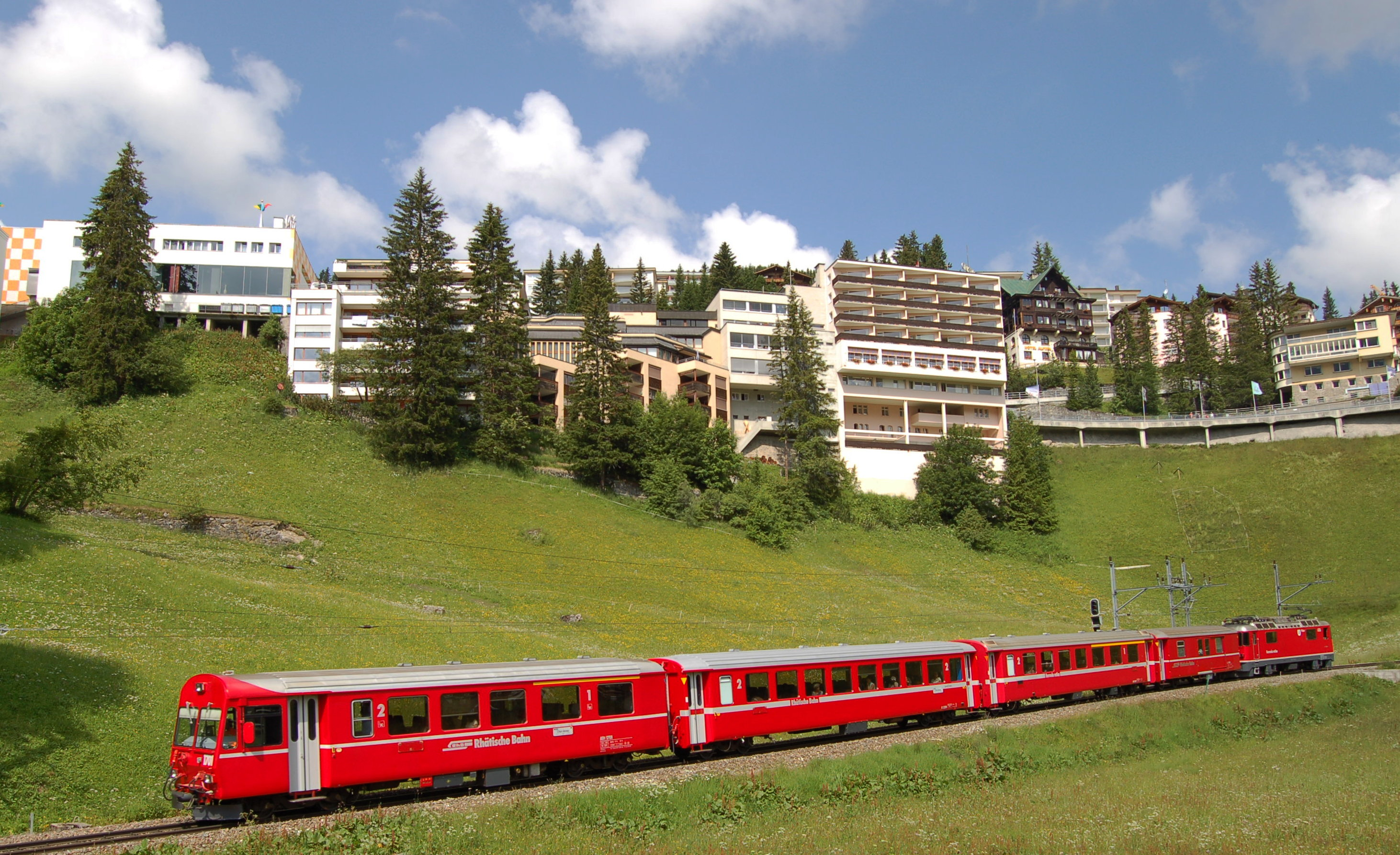
In the basin of the Arosa Untersee (lower lake)

The branch line starts on the forecourt of Chur station, where the trains to Arosa use tracks 1 and 2, each adjoining an outside platform. A rail track connects to the Landquart–Thusis railway, although this is only used for the movement of rolling stock to and from the main Landquart workshop.

The railway traverses the urban area of Chur, initially on two tracks. This section is similar to a tramway and consists of grooved rails. At one point the line runs across a roundabout. After about one-half kilometre (0.3 mi), the line becomes single-track before crossing Grabenstrasse. Soon after, it reaches the right bank of the Plessur and a little later Chur Altstadt near the historic centre, which is now the only station on the line classified as a halt. Shortly before leaving Chur, the Sand depot and workshop is located on the left in the suburb of Sand. Today, it is used to store the vehicles of a track construction company, but part of it can still be used as a crossing loop.

About 1.6 km (1 mi) later, the line leaves the roadway. For a few hundred metres, it now runs to the right of the considerably narrower road on Vignoles rails, until the line reaches the former halt of Chur-Sassal, which was abandoned in 2001. Immediately afterwards, the line crosses the Churs city limits from which the railway runs completely independently of the road as a mountain railway up the Schanfigg valley.

The rest of the line contains many civil engineering structures, including a total of 41 bridges, 19 tunnels and 12 avalanche-protection galleries. The largest structures are the Langwieser Viaduct, the Gründjitobel Viaduct—both in the territory of the former municipality of Langwies—and the Castielertobel Viaduct between Calfreisen and Castiel. The longest tunnel is the 399 m (1,309 ft) Lüener Rüfe tunnel.

Over its whole length, the line climbs a total of 1,155 m (3,789 ft) in elevation and crosses the Plessur once and the Schanfiggerstrasse (Schanfigg road) three times. The five intermediate stations of Lüen-Castiel, St. Peter-Molinis, Peist, Langwies and Litzirüti are served before the line reaches the terminus of Arosa on the Obersee (upper lake), 25.681 km (15.957 mi) from Chur. There are two additional crossing loops at Untersax and Haspelgrube.

== Operations ==
The trains take just over an hour to complete the journey. With the exception of Litzirüti and Langwies, all the intermediate stations are request stops. A Regio service runs hourly, requiring three sets. They are scheduled to cross in Lüen-Castiel and Litzirüti.

In addition to the Regio trains, two additional RegioExpress pairs, which do not serve all intermediate stops, run in the winter season. Two pairs of regional services run in the summer season; these include open summer cars when the weather is good.

Train paths are allocated for freight traffic on the line, but freight trains operate only when there is a substantial need. Normally, freight wagons are attached to passenger trains.

Passenger traffic has amounted to around 400,000 trips per year in recent years. The Arosa Railway carries more than 50,000 tonnes of freight a year—mainly in the form of wood, gravel, sand and cement.

== History ==
=== Projects and preparatory work ===
The first proposals for a railway from Chur to Arosa originated around the turn of the twentieth century, when it was realised that the Schanfiggerstrasse, which was completed in 1890, would not be able to cope with the traffic bound to the rapidly expanding spa of Arosa. Local spa doctor Carl Rüedi was the first to apply for a concession to build a railway line. A meeting was held in St. Peter with the Schanfigg stakeholders on 9 February 1901. It was planned to run the line along the cantonal road after it was widened with some sections on separate track through tunnels in difficult places. The terminal station would have been built on the Hubelwiese at the Hotel Hof Arosa. After the unexpected death of Rüedi in June 1901, his concession lapsed and his plans were no longer pursued.

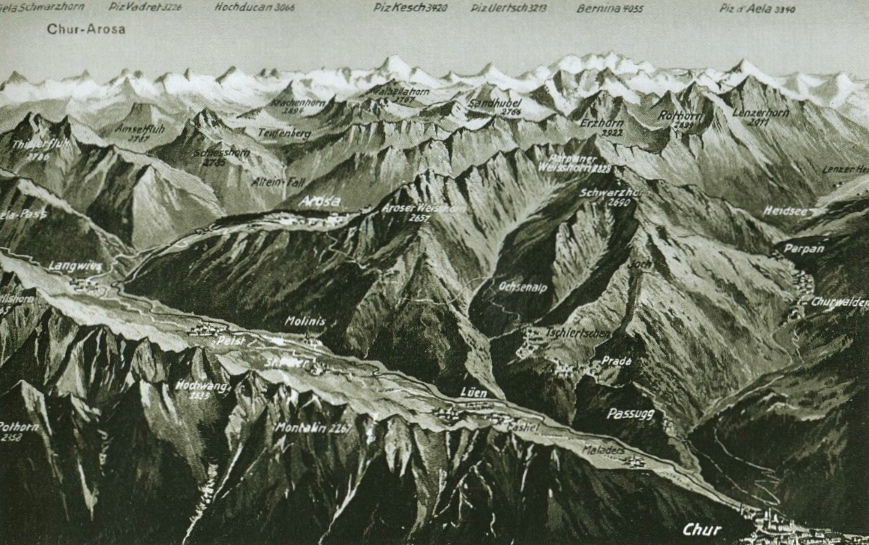
Course of the track (black)

The Chur engineer Robert Wildberger and his colleague Englert applied for a concession for the construction of an electric railway to Arosa in January 1903. Their application competed with numerous other applications filed in the meantime. The most notable counter-proposal came from the Zurich-based firm of Müller, Zeerleder, Gobat & Thomann, which later built the Gründjitobel Viaduct. It put forward three different options, with the first involving a 23.4 km (14.5 mi) line running on the left side of the Plessur. The second option, with a total length of 21.5 km (13.4 mi), would have run via Passugg, Tschiertschen and Litzirüti to Arosa. The third option would have essentially followed the Schanfiggerstrasse on a 28 km (17 mi) route. The latter two options provided for rack railways to overcome the slope, which was expressly not recommended by the chief engineer Moser of Zurich, who had been commissioned by the municipality of Arosa.

In view of the differing interests of the valley communities, the previous applicants for a concession joined together in March 1905 to prepare a joint study with three different options. All three proposals began at the Chur station forecourt, headed west and crossed the Plessur near the Welschdörfli district, ran under the Rosenhügel through a 500 m (1,600 ft)-long tunnel and had their first stop at Bodmergut. Finally, at the end of October 1907, there was a modified project which, although later realised, was initially rejected by an Arosa town meeting. The location of the Arosa terminal station was particularly controversial. As a result, the Arosa municipality first decided to examine more closely another proposal from the Churwalden line (Churwaldnerlinie) company for a line from Chur via Passugg, Malix and Parpan to Arosa with a possible, later, connection to Lenzerheide. The core of this 32 km (20 mi) project was a tunnel connection under the Urdenfürggli and the Hörnli mountains to the Wasserboden lake at an altitude of 2,100 m (6,900 ft). The terminus would have been located in Innerarosa near the Bergkirchli (church). The application for a concession was lodged on 15 October 1908.

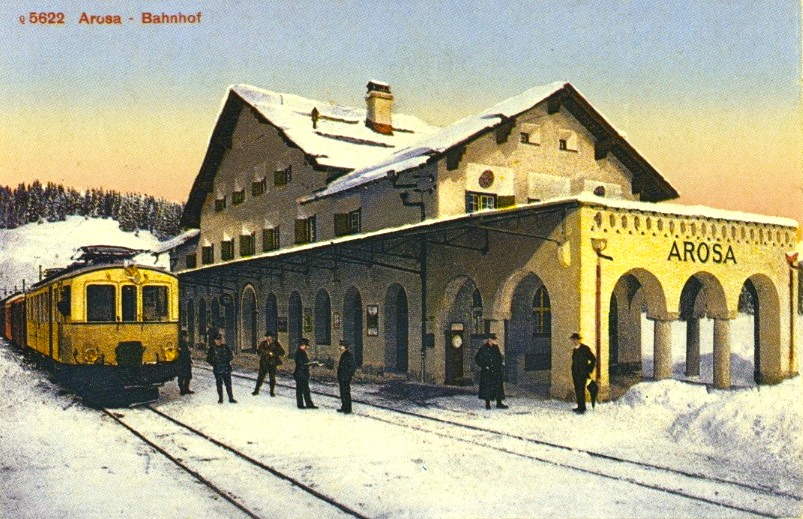
Arosa station in about 1915

It was followed by a protracted competition between the Wildberger & Co. project, which was revised again and favoured by the Schanfigg valley communities, and the proposal of Ahlsfeld & Spyri, which initially also found the support of the city of Chur. For a short time, another project via Tschiertschen was also discussed. After a conference to determine a way forward in December 1909, the Chur city council supported the project of Wildberger, which also caused a change in opinion in Arosa and led to a withdrawal of the Churwalden line's application for a concession. Nevertheless, an engineer from Chur, Versell, proposed a new, 24 km (15 mi) option, the so-called Lenzerheidebahn via Malix, Praden, Tschiertschen and under the Ochsenalp to the Obersee. Although this proposal enjoyed a degree of support in Arosa, it focused from then on the financing of the Wildberger proposal, which provided for a pure adhesion railway with a maximum of 6.0% grade. In March 1910, negotiations were conducted on the location of Arosa station and the route was optimised. Since the rolling stock of the RhB would be able to run on the line, the minimum radius of curvature was set at 60 m (200 ft).

=== Foundation of the ChA and construction ===
Even before finance for the railway was definitively secured, the ChA was provisionally constituted on 15 July 1911 and formally established in Chur with a share capital of CHF 7.6 million at its general meeting on 4 July 1912. The canton of Grisons was a majority shareholder from the beginning. Gustav Bener, who had been commissioned as chief engineer, and the Wildberger company resolved outstanding issues and presented plans to the Grisons government for approval on 4 March 1912. Construction began on 1 August 1912 under the direction of Bener and his deputy Hans Studer, the builder of the Wiesen Viaduct. Since the city of Chur was planning to build a tram line at the same time, it suggested that the route from Arosa to Sassal be routed through the city. With the elimination of the Rosenhügelel tunnel and the two bridges over the Plessur, the ChA reduced construction costs by approximately CHF 150,000. The track was divided into four lots, which employed a total of about 1,000 workers. The unstable terrain made site management difficult, causing the original opening date of 15 November 1914 to be postponed.

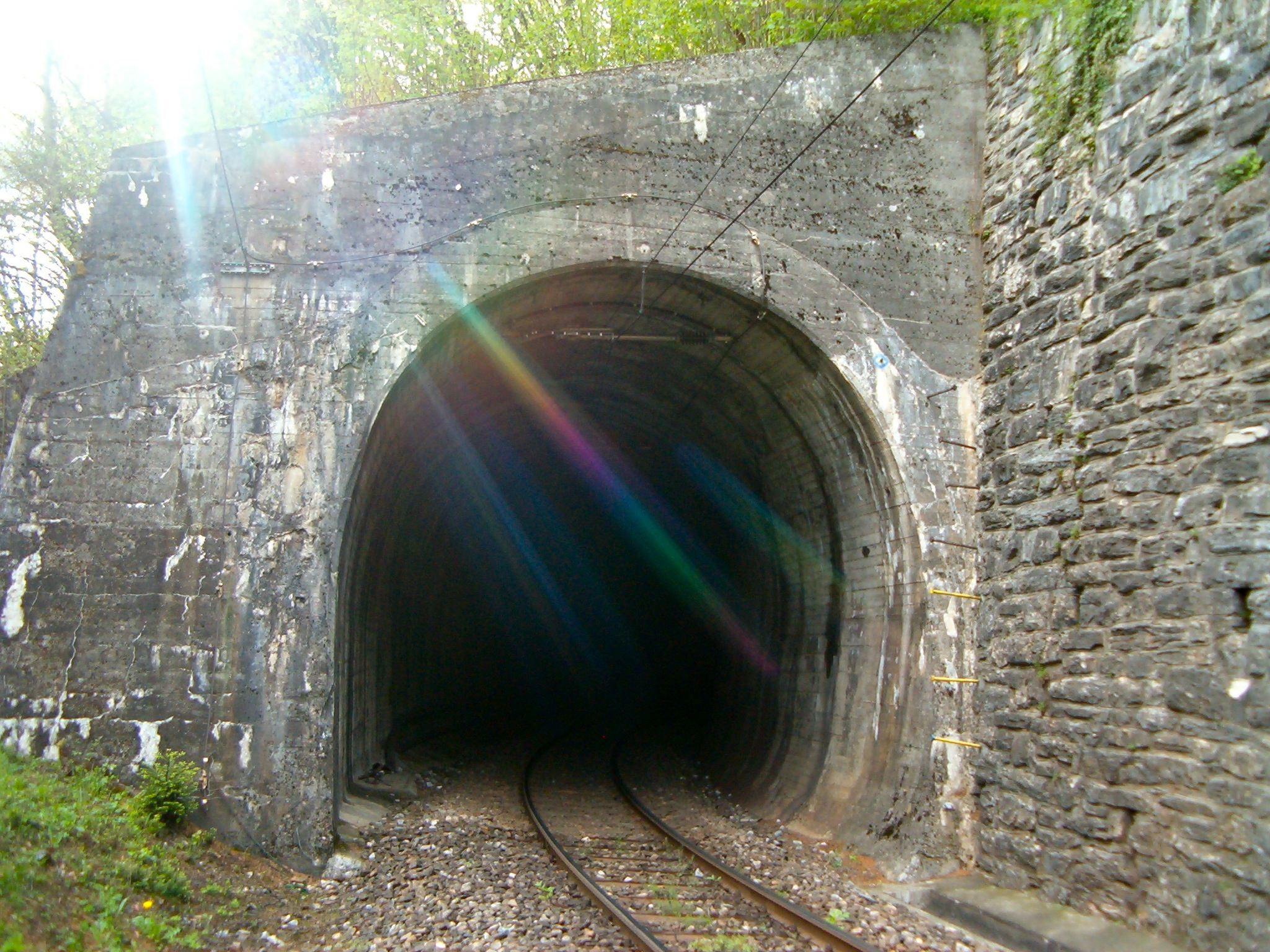
The east portal of the extended Spundascha tunnel, built in concrete due to the great ground pressure

In November 1913, a retaining wall collapsed at the Dorfbach bridge; the existing steel girder bridge was being extended with the addition of three segments, which as a result lay on a curve with a radius of 60 m (200 ft). In February 1914, after the collapse of a retaining wall, 740 cubic metres (26,000 ft^{3}) of fill along with the track collapsed. In March 1914, the tracks were dislodged at the east portal of the Sassal III tunnel. In April 1914, the dome of the Nesslaries tunnel deformed and the vault in the Bärenfalle tunnel collapsed. The ground had to be stabilised and drained between km 4.7 and 5. In addition, the vault of the 148 m (486 ft) Spundscha tunnel was so deformed that a 216 m (709 ft) bypass tunnel had to be built. This tunnel work started on 9 April 1914 and took only five months. During this time, the trains ran over a wooden bypass bridge, which could support an axle load of 12 tonnes. The construction of the Lüen power plant, which was intended to supply both the railway line and the city of Chur with electricity, was not allowed to fall behind, unlike the other works. In addition to the difficult terrain, preparations for the general mobilisation at the beginning of the First World War also caused serious problems, as various construction workers and engineers were drafted for military service. In particular this affected Hans Studer, who had to resign from his post as deputy chief engineer.

Despite all difficulties, the line was finally opened on 12 December 1914 after only two years of construction. With construction costs of CHF 402,700 per kilometer, the Chur–Arosa line was the most expensive on the Rhaetian Railway network.

=== Operation and maintenance 1914–1988 / merger with the RhB in 1942 ===
The journey from Chur to Arosa initially took between 80 and 85 minutes. The ChA used a different electrification system for its blue and white rolling stock than the neighbouring Rhaetian Railway, namely the rare voltage of 2400 volts DC. At the beginning of the 1930s, the heavily worn rails were replaced and extended the sidings. A concrete rockfall shelter was built between the Sassal I and II tunnels in 1931.

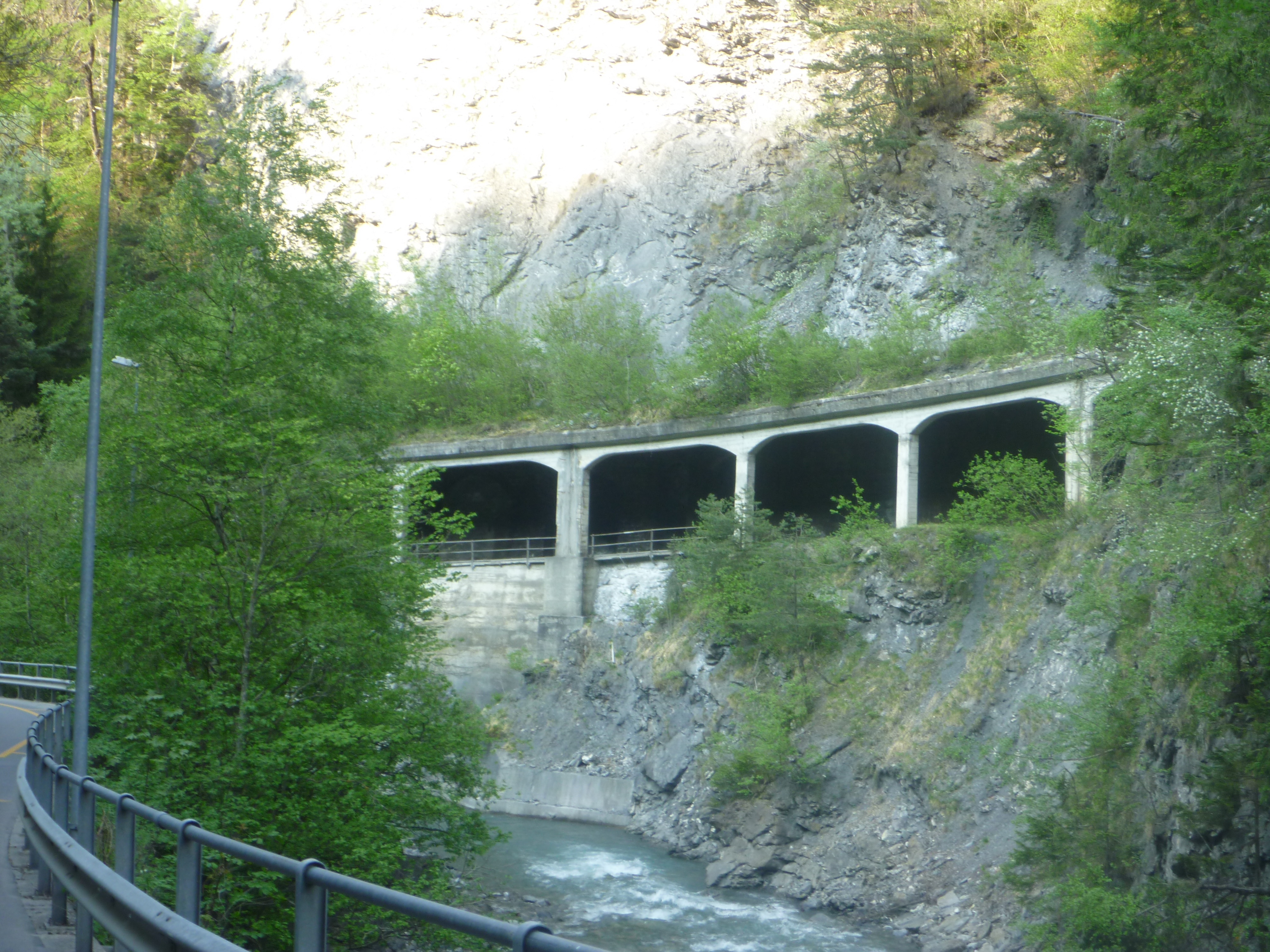
Rockfall shelter above Sassal

In contrast to the then still independent Bernina Railway, the Chur-Arosa Railway was financially successful in the early years. However, the Great Depression, the Second World War and the increasing competition with cars ensured that it too fell into economic difficulties. Investment had to be kept to a minimum, which was problematic considering the age of the rolling stock. In order to benefit from financial support for distressed railway companies, the Arosa railway had to merge with the Rhaetian Railway, because it was not regarded as important for the war effort. The company was therefore incorporated into the Rhaetian Railway in 1942, at the same time as the Bellinzona–Mesocco railway and a year before it absorbed the Bernina Railway. The RhB took over all assets and liabilities as well as all 146 employees. As part of this, consideration was given to converting the Arosa line to single-phase alternating current and the Ge 4/4 I main network locomotives that were under construction were modified for the possible new application. Nevertheless, it continued to be operated under the old electrical system. The renovation of the Castielertobel Viaduct, the largest reconstruction project to date, had to be carried out in the year of the merger.

After the Second World War, three new three new substations with rectifier systems were built to improve the power supply in Chur-Sand, Lüen-Castiel and in the Haspel mine. In 1951, the Gitzistein Tunnel received a gallery (avalanche protection) on both sides, and in 1956, the Sassal II and III tunnels were connected by a concrete gallery. To secure a bridge abutment in the Lüen ravine (Lüener Tobel) against landslides, a suspension device with wire ropes was installed between the abutment and the pier in 1955. It was attached to a weight of twelve tonnes, which acted on the pier head and held it in the desired position with a force of 50 tonnes.

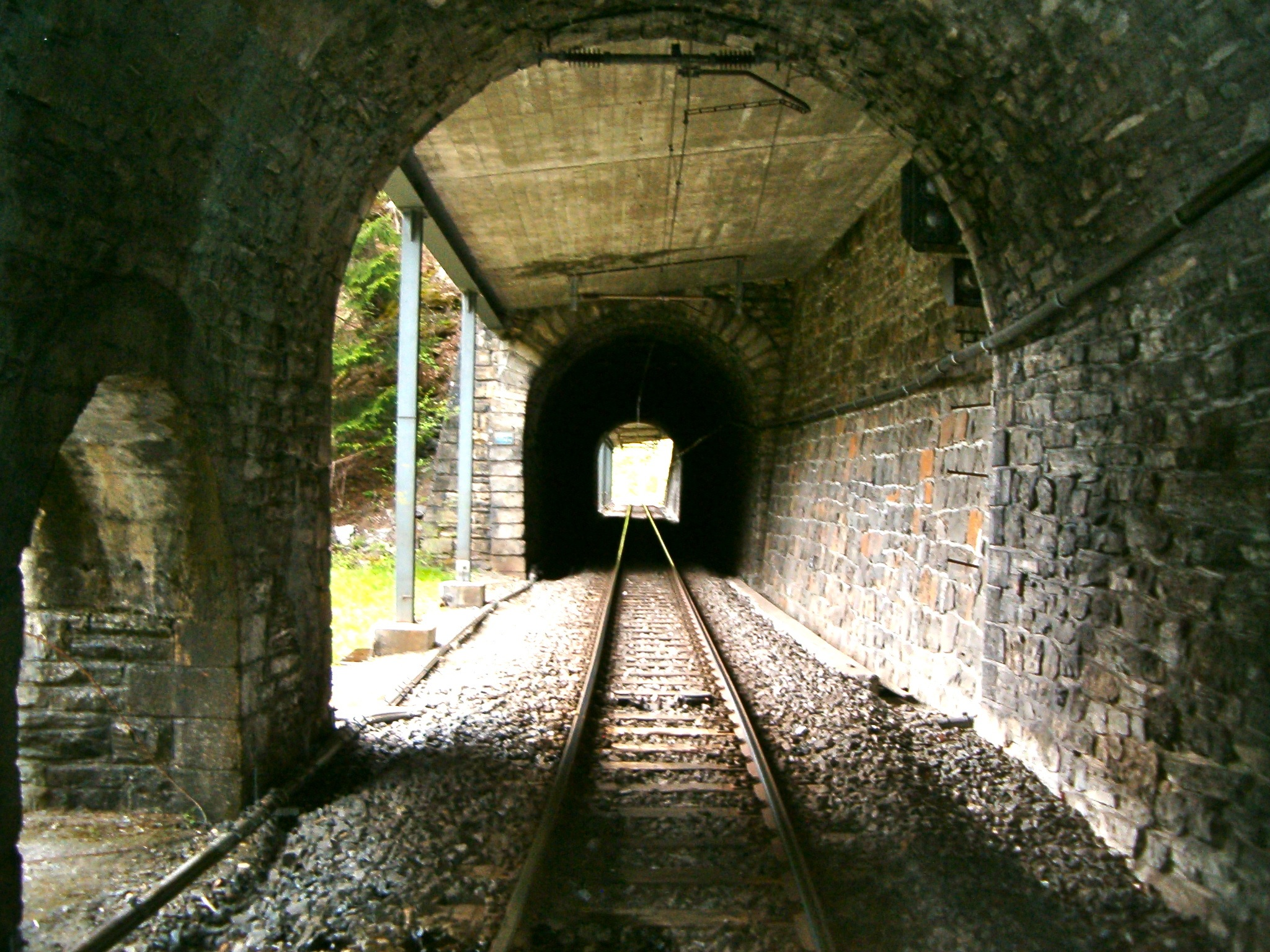
Gitzistein Tunnel with shelter

Push–pull operations were introduced in 1969. This eliminated the need to run the locomotive around at the termini, which brought a significant simplification of operation. Automatic block signaling and the remote control of operations were introduced on 22 November 1971 to ensure safe train operations. In addition, all passing loops and stations received additional shunting signals.

Trial express services ran without stopping at Langwies from 1979 to 1981. However, the time gain was insignificant, so the stop at Langwies was reinstated. A project study investigated relocating the railway from Lüen to a new tunnel to avoid landslides near the Cuorra Tunnel in 1985. Train radio was introduced and staffed operations at stations—except at Arosa, Chur and Langwies—were abandoned for cost reasons in 1985. After repeated rock falls, the Sassal III tunnel received a 147 m (482 ft) rock shelter in 1986. The rockfall galleries below the Meiersboden Tunnel were built in 1987. The maximum draw weight for the descent has been set at 206 tonnes.

=== 1988 Chur underground station project ===
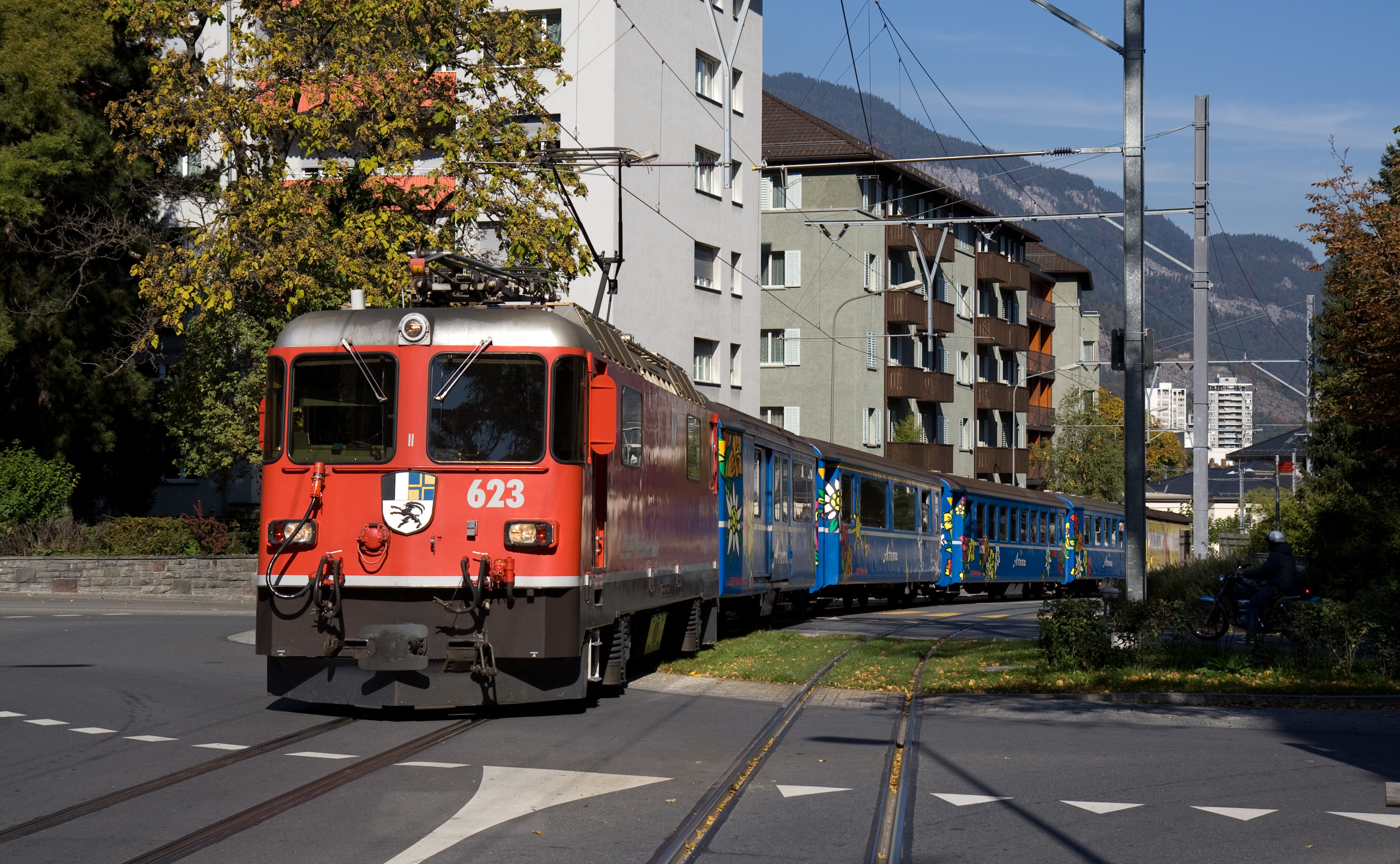
Two-track passage through the Engadinstrasse-Gäuggelistrasse roundabout in Chur

In 1988, Chur voters approved by a large majority a project that would have included a three-track underground station for the Arosa Railway as well as the 2,836 m (1.762 mi) Mittenberg Tunnel between Chur station and Sassal. The project, which would have been built during the planned conversion of the Arosa railway to 11 kilovolts AC, had to be abandoned in the autumn of 1996 due to the withdrawal of a guaranteed federal contribution. The planned line would have first run to the east and then turned to the south past the Mittenberg (mountain) in order to run under as few buildings as possible. Part of the new line would have been built in the open, but most of it would have been in a bored tunnel. The new route would have reduced running time by three minutes, despite it being 300 m (980 ft) longer. An underground crossing loop was also planned to increase capacity. The platforms were designed so that trains up to 200 m (660 ft) in length could be used in the future. The construction of this project would have cost about CHF 310 million.

As an alternative, the Rhaetian Railway was determined to improve the traffic conditions in the area of Chur station and improvements to the city line, including the installation of a double-track section, was completed on 6 May 2007. Trains and road vehicles formerly approached each other head on in some places.

=== Re-electrification with AC in 1997 ===
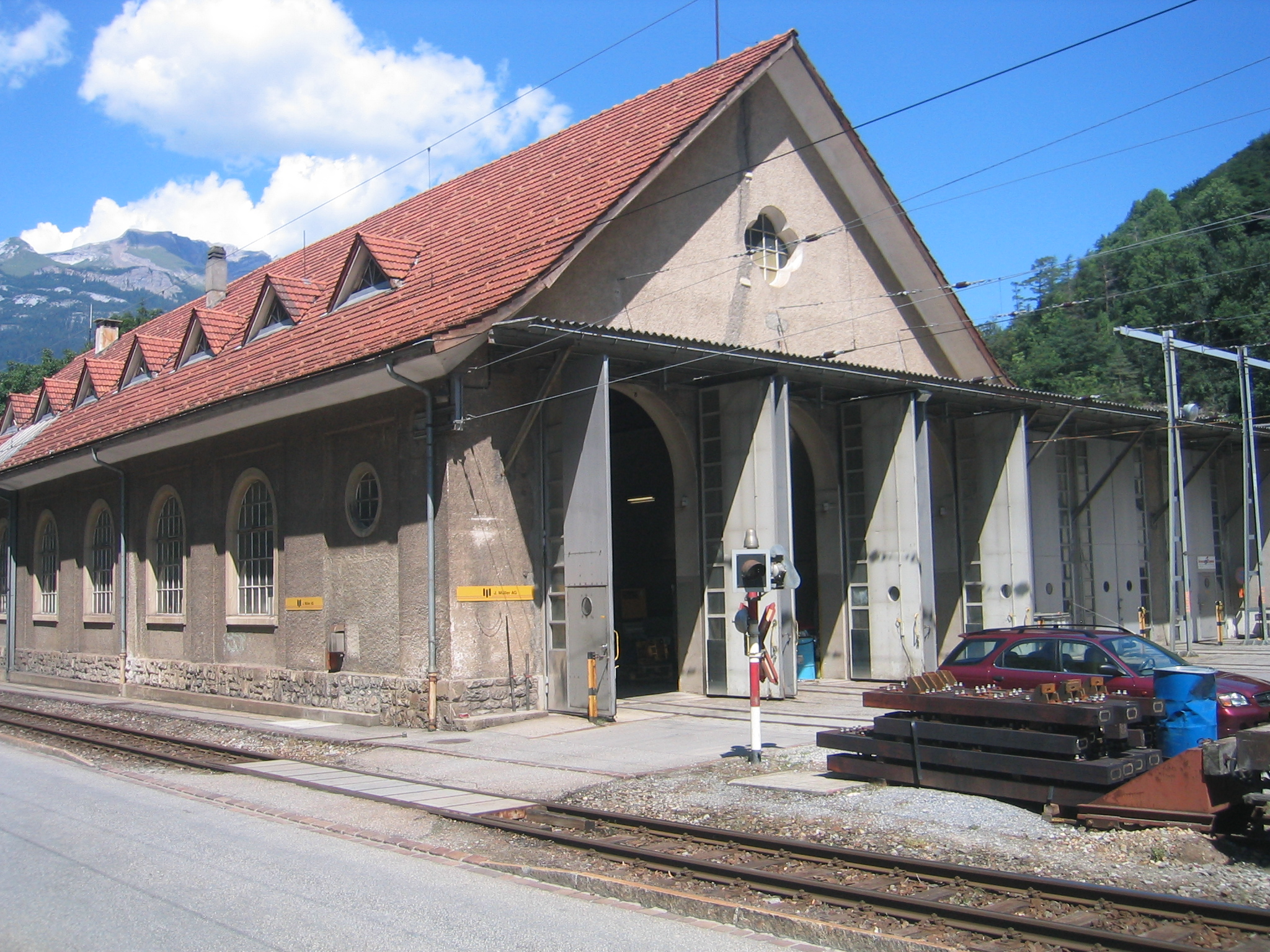
The former Sand depot

On 29 November 1997, the electrification system of the Arosa Railway was made compatible with the Rhaetian Railway's main network with the conversion of the overhead wire voltage to 11 kilovolts AC, the extensive rehabilitation of the line, the renewal of the power supply and the modification of the rolling stock used. While for the previous 83 years, the line's power supply had been sourced from Arosa Energie (Lüen power station), it was now fed via a new supply line from the RhB substation in Reichenau-Tamins to Chur station and the city line. The Sand substation, which feeds the contact wire between Sassal and Arosa, is also supplied via a cable in the river bed of the Plessur. As a result of a newly developed system of overhead wire, suspension and power supply, costly construction measures in tunnels and cuttings—in particular the lowering of the track—were kept to a minimum. The profiles of the Lüener Rüfe, Steinboden, Clasauertobel, Bärenfalle and Cuorra tunnels were easily adapted. Furthermore, extensive reinforcements were necessary on the track and on individual bridge structures. The Sand depot became superfluous with the change of the electrical system and closed. The total modernisation costs, including investment in rolling stock and the extension of the passing loop at St. Peter-Molinis station, amounted to CHF 58.3 million, 96 per cent of which was borne by the federal government.

=== New tunnel projects ===
For some years now, the possibility of an underground rail link between the Schanfigg and the Davos area has been discussed, after a concession had already been granted in 1913 for the construction of a never-completed railway line from Arosa or Langwies to Davos. Due to a parliamentary initiative, Amberg Engineering AG prepared a preliminary project for the construction of a tunnel between Litzirüti and Davos in 2010 on behalf of the government of the Grisons. However, the government of the Grisons did not classify such a project as a priority due to tight finances.

During the June 2015 session of the Grand Council of the Canton of the Grisons, the Davos parliamentarian Rico Stiffler submitted a renewed application for the government of the Grisons to support a project for a railway tunnel between the Schanfigg and Davos. The opening of the Urdenbahn cable car between Arosa and the Lenzerheide in 2014 has strengthened the case for an Arosa–Davos link.

=== Further adjustments, projects and events since the 1990s ===
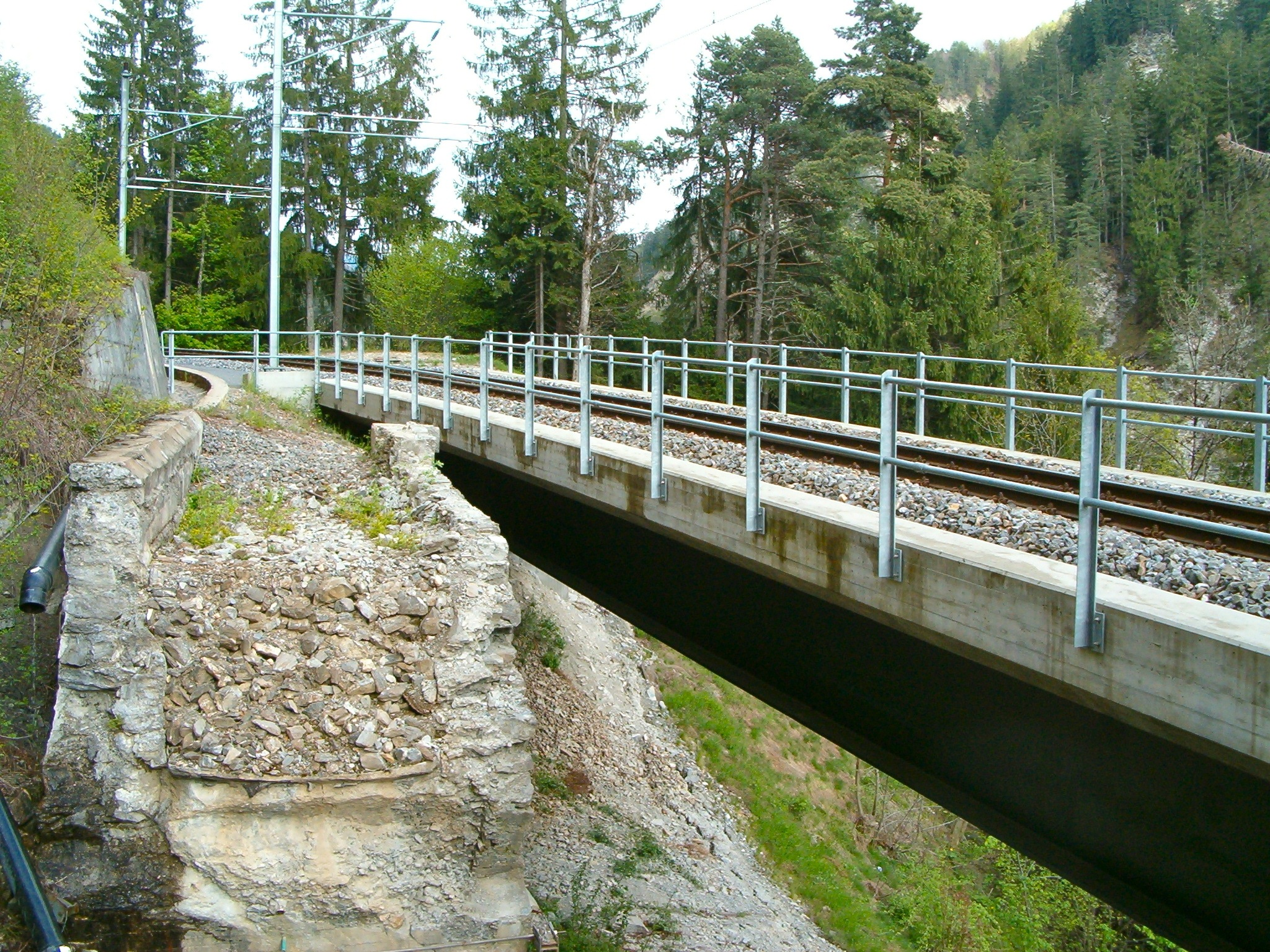
New Dorfbach bridge with abutment of the earlier stone construction

Since the construction of the railway line, the unstable slope in the Plaschenz area at the Sandgrind Tunnel has been steadily stabilised. Due to their deteriorating condition over time, three bridges had to be replaced, the Schmalztobel bridge in 1993/94 and the Fatschazertobel bridge and the Farbtobel bridge later. The line was closed due to landslides and rockfalls in the Schafsita/Steinboden area below Calfreisen from 24 April to 20 May 2001 and in the outer Schanfigg area from 30 June to 15 November 2001. In addition to the construction of a shelter for the line at the Steinboden tunnel, the slope had to be stabilised. A bus service was established between Chur and St. Peter-Molinis. In 2002, the earth moved on the slope in the Verbrunnawald area at the Lüener Rüfe tunnel. In 2007, the stone Rüti bridge was demolished and replaced with a new structure made of reinforced concrete. Two viaducts were comprehensively refurbished: the Castielertobel Viaduct in 2006, the Langwieser Viaduct in 2009 and the Calfreisertobel Viaduct in 2010. Following the partial collapse of a side wall as a result of water inflow on 3 April 2009, a replacement of the Partusa bridge at Peist was planned and built in 2010. Almost 1.5 km (0.9 mi) of track were renewed on four sections in 2011. This concerned the areas between the Arosa tunnel and the concrete plant on the Iselstrasse (480 m [1,570 ft]), parts of the Litzirüti–Langwies section (374 m [1,227 ft]) and the Langwies–Peist section (379 m [1,243 ft]) and 235 m (771 ft) of tracks below Lüen–Castiel station. The lifespan of the renovated sections is estimated at 35 to 50 years.

A comprehensive renovation of the Clasaur Tobel Viaduct, which runs directly into the tunnel of the same name, was also carried out in 2011. Permanent changes in the slope led to severe damage to this hard to reach structure. The deformed stone arches were demolished down to the foundations and were replaced by three new steel towers. The construction work was completed in autumn 2011. The two stone arch bridges over the Schanfiggerstrasse between Litzirüti and Arosa (Rütland bridge (2012) and Bodenwald viaduct (2013)) were replaced by three-span concrete girder bridges. This work also improved the traffic flow on the cantonal road. The reconstruction costs for the Rütland bridge amounted to CHF 1.9 million, 85% provided by the Federal Government. The costs incurred for the Bodenwald Viaduct was estimated at CHF 2.1 million.

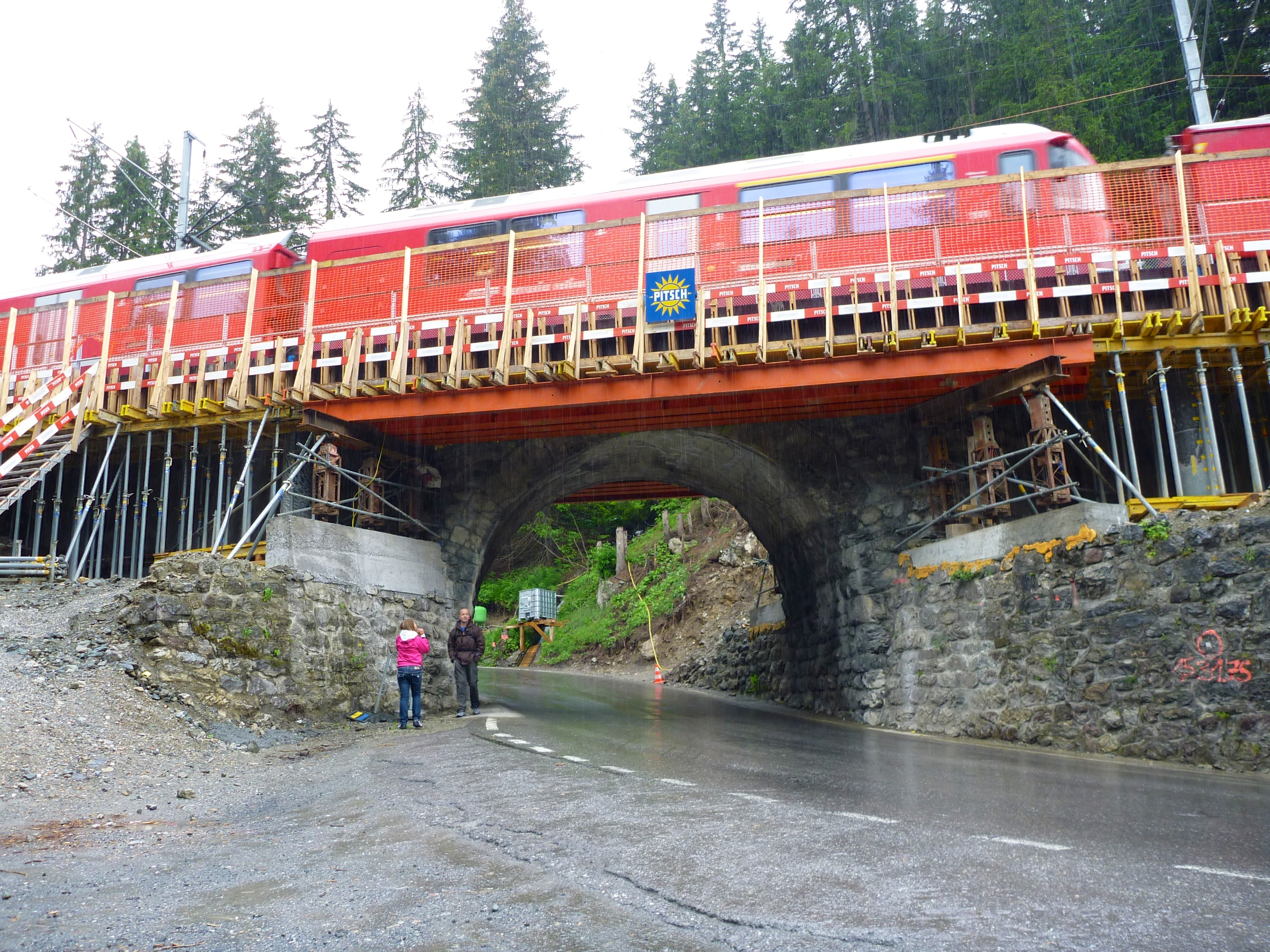
The Rütland bridge under construction in 2012

On Good Friday, 29 March 2013, rocks fell on the railway again at the east portal of the Lüener Rüfe tunnel over a length of about 100 m (330 ft). Of the approximately 20,000 cubic metres (710,000 ft^{3}) of rock, which had slid from about 500 m (1,600 ft) above the line, about 100 m^{3} (3,500 ft^{3}) crashed onto the line, damaging the rails, sleepers, electricity pylons and the overhead line. Railway services were closed until 24 April 2013 and public transport to Schanfigg was replaced by buses. In addition to clearing, the extensive safety measures included the demolition of two unstable rock spires in the area affected. The costs incurred by the rockfall amounted to about CHF 750,000. A connection with the 2002 event could apparently be ruled out.

The line had to be closed again after a rock fall occurred in the same place on 16 October 2013. As rock continued to break off over the following days, a bus replacement traffic was established between Chur and St. Peter-Molinis. In order to stabilise the situation at the site, two rocks containing a total of 2,300 m^{3} (81,000 ft^{3}) of material were demolished on 8 November 2013. Loose rubble was also removed using earth-moving equipment and certain rock areas were covered with a net under tension before the actual repair of the railway facilities commenced. The securing of the slope continues to rely on the construction of rockfall nets. In the long term, however, the construction of a gallery or even a small extension of the Lüen Rüfe Tunnel may be necessary. Nine weeks of closure of the line was scheduled to end on 20 December 2013. The costs of repairing the two rockfalls and the damage caused to the railway track amounted to around CHF 3.8 million, most of which was borne by the federal government and the canton of the Grisons. The RhB had to fund CHF 1.5 million for replacement services for the cancelled railway operations. The rockfall nets in the landslide area were planned to be completed in 2014.

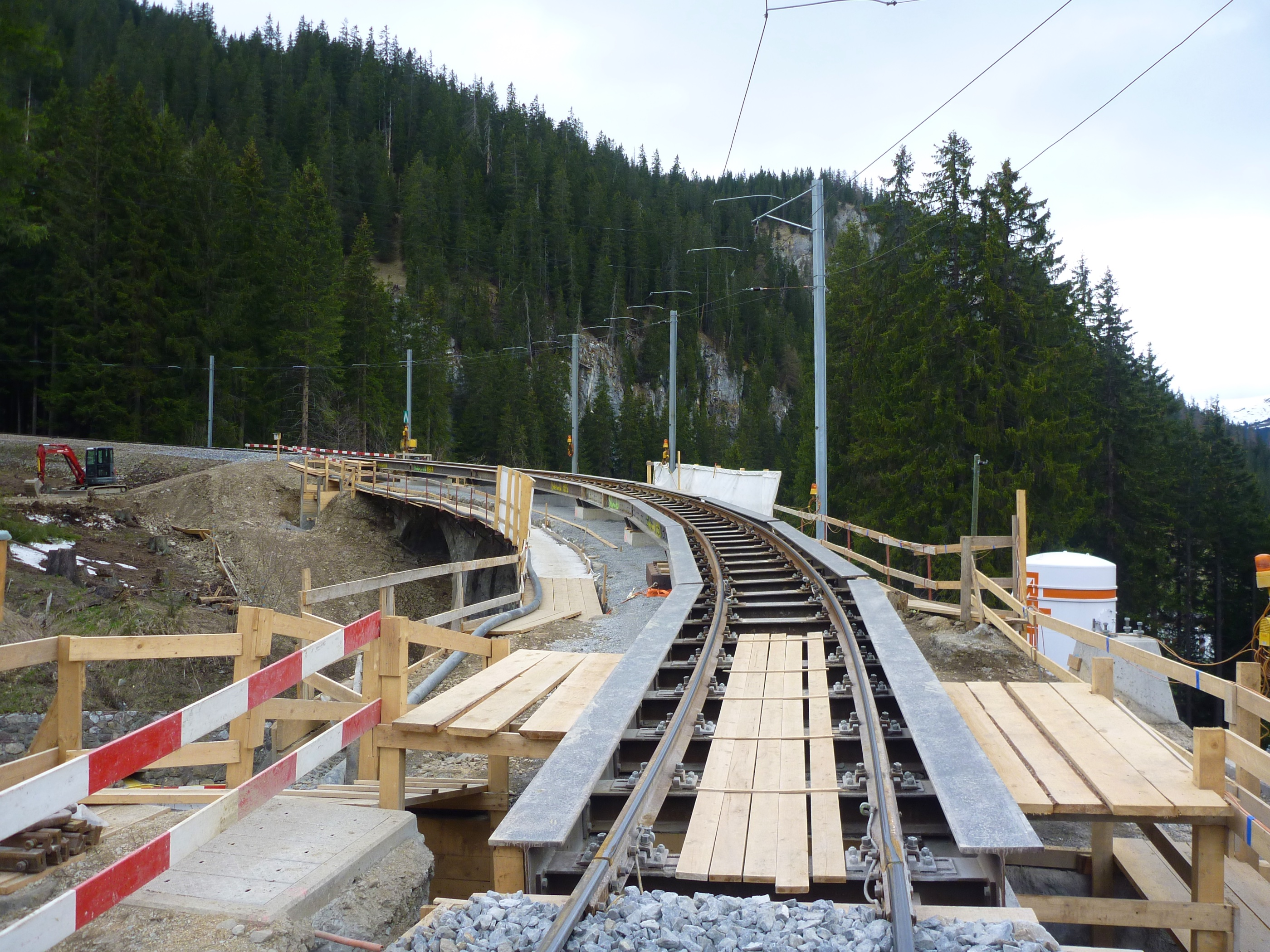
The Bodenwald Viaduct under renovation

Also in 2013, the Äber (in Swiss German; Eber in German) gallery was demolished above Sassal and replaced by rockfall nets. In time for the 100th anniversary of the Arosa Railway, Arosa station was rebuilt with work completed in December 2014 at a cost of more than CHF 24 million. The extensive modernisation was carried out in cooperation by the RhB, the canton of the Grisons, the municipality of Arosa and Arosa Bergbahnen AG.

In the spring of 2014, the slipping Grosstobel Bridge at Pagig was extensively renovated for CHF 3.2 million. This involved the securing of the two pillars and the abutments as well as the creation of new troughs for collecting rocks. In addition, there were local reinforcements of the steel construction, which had been most recently strengthened in 1982, with the installation of new control structures. Renewal of the overhead line between St. Peter and Peist was also carried out in 2014 at a cost about CHF 1.7 million. About 1.5 km (0.9 mi) of overhead line between Langwies and Peist was also replaced for CHF 600,000.

Wet fresh snow on 23 October and 6 November 2014 caused damage to the catenary between Litzirüti and Arosa and St. Peter-Molinis and Peist. A storm as a result of an Alpine föhn on 4 November 2014 closed both the railway and the Schanfiggerstrasse (road) between Arosa and Langwies. Arosa was cut off from the outside world for eight hours.
