= St. Peter-Pagig =

- Former municipality
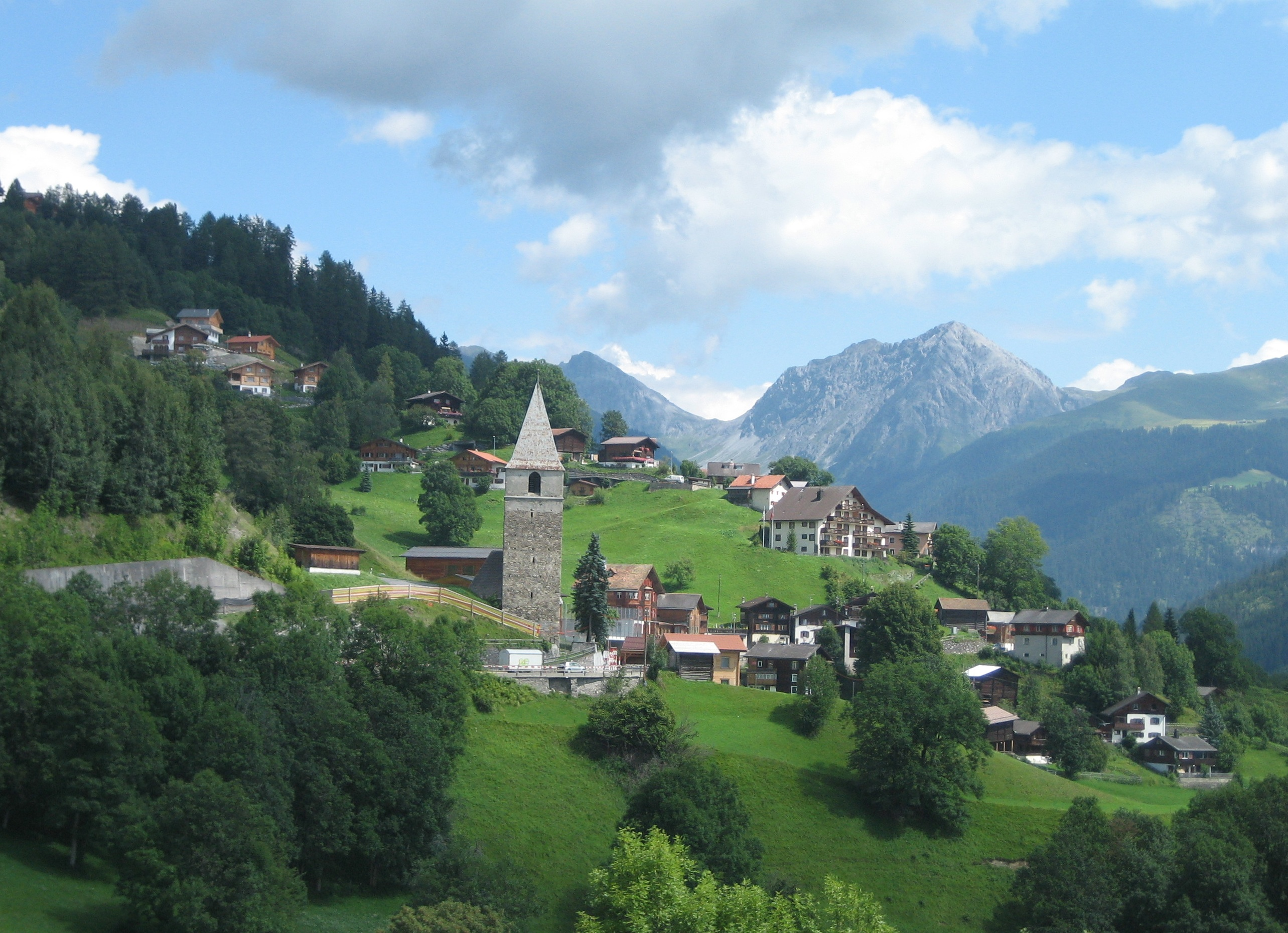

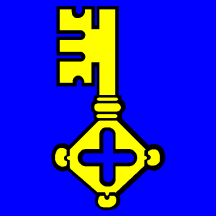
- Flag Coat of arms
- Location of St. Peter-Pagig
- Location within Switzerland Location within Canton of Graubünden
- Coordinates: 46°50′N 9°38′E
- Country: Switzerland
- Canton: Graubünden
- District: Plessur

Area
  - Total: 12.15 km^{2} (4.69 sq mi)
- Elevation: 688 m (2,257 ft)

Population (Dec 2010)
  - Total: 214
  - Density: 17.6/km^{2} (45.6/sq mi)
- Demonym(s): Pagig, St. Peter
- Time zone: UTC+01:00 (CET)
  - Summer (DST): UTC+02:00 (CEST)
- Postal code: 7028 St. Peter GR
- SFOS number: 3931
- ISO 3166 code: CH-GR
- Surrounded by: Castiel, Furna, Lüen, Molinis, Peist, Trimmis
- Website: SFSO statistics

St. Peter-Pagig is a former municipality in the district of Plessur in the Grisons, Switzerland. It was formed on 1 January 2008 through the merger of St. Peter and Pagig. On 1 January 2013 the former municipalities of St. Peter-Pagig, Calfreisen, Castiel, Langwies, Lüen, Molinis and Peist merged into the municipality of Arosa.

== Geography ==
Before the merger, St. Peter-Pagig had a total area of 12.1 km^{2} (4.7 mi^{2}).

The former municipality is located in the Schanfigg sub-district of the Plessur district on the northern side of the mid-Schanfigg valley.

On the border with the municipality of Molinis is the Sankt Peter-Molinis railway station, on the Chur-Arosa railway line.

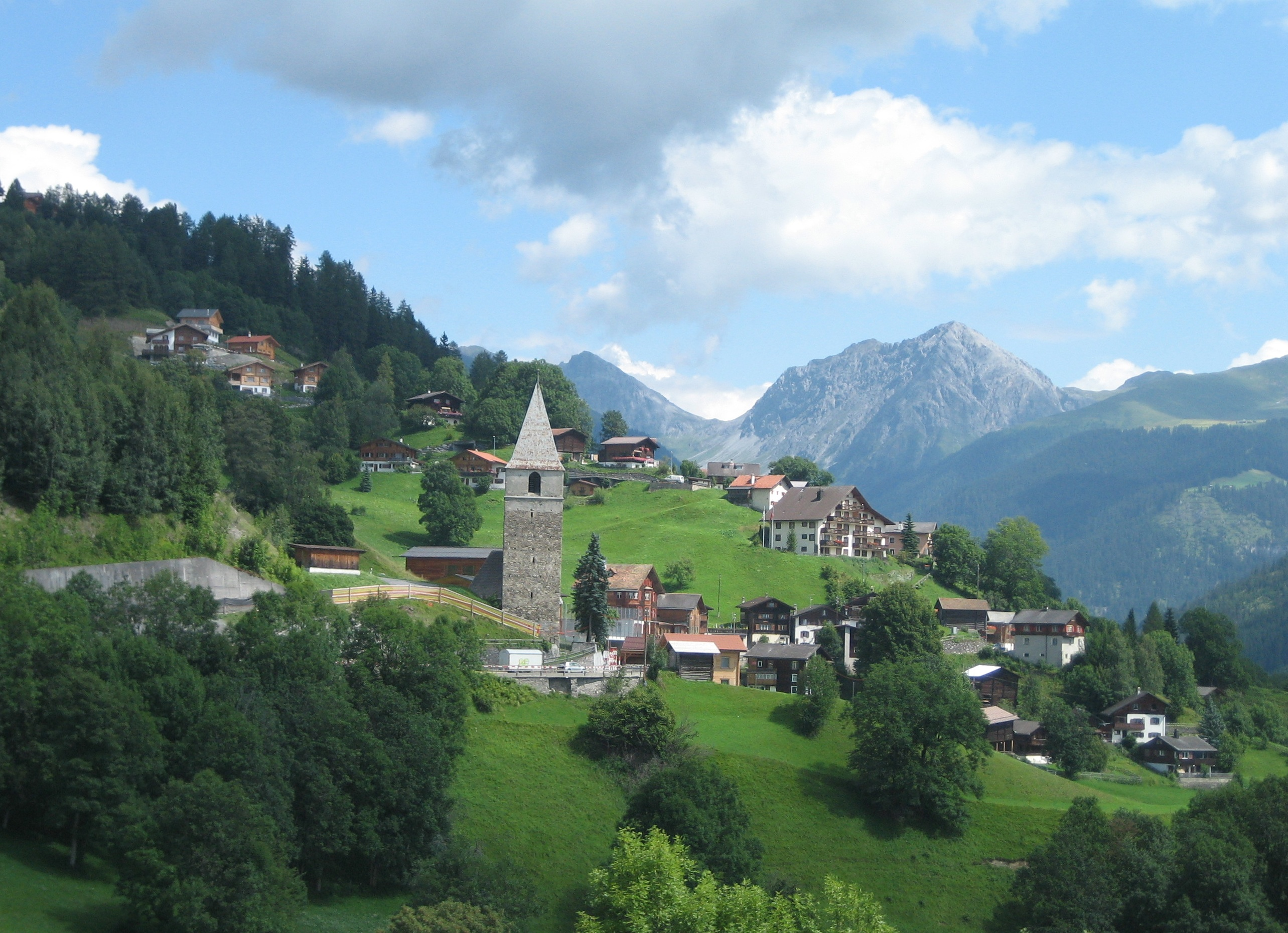
St Peter village

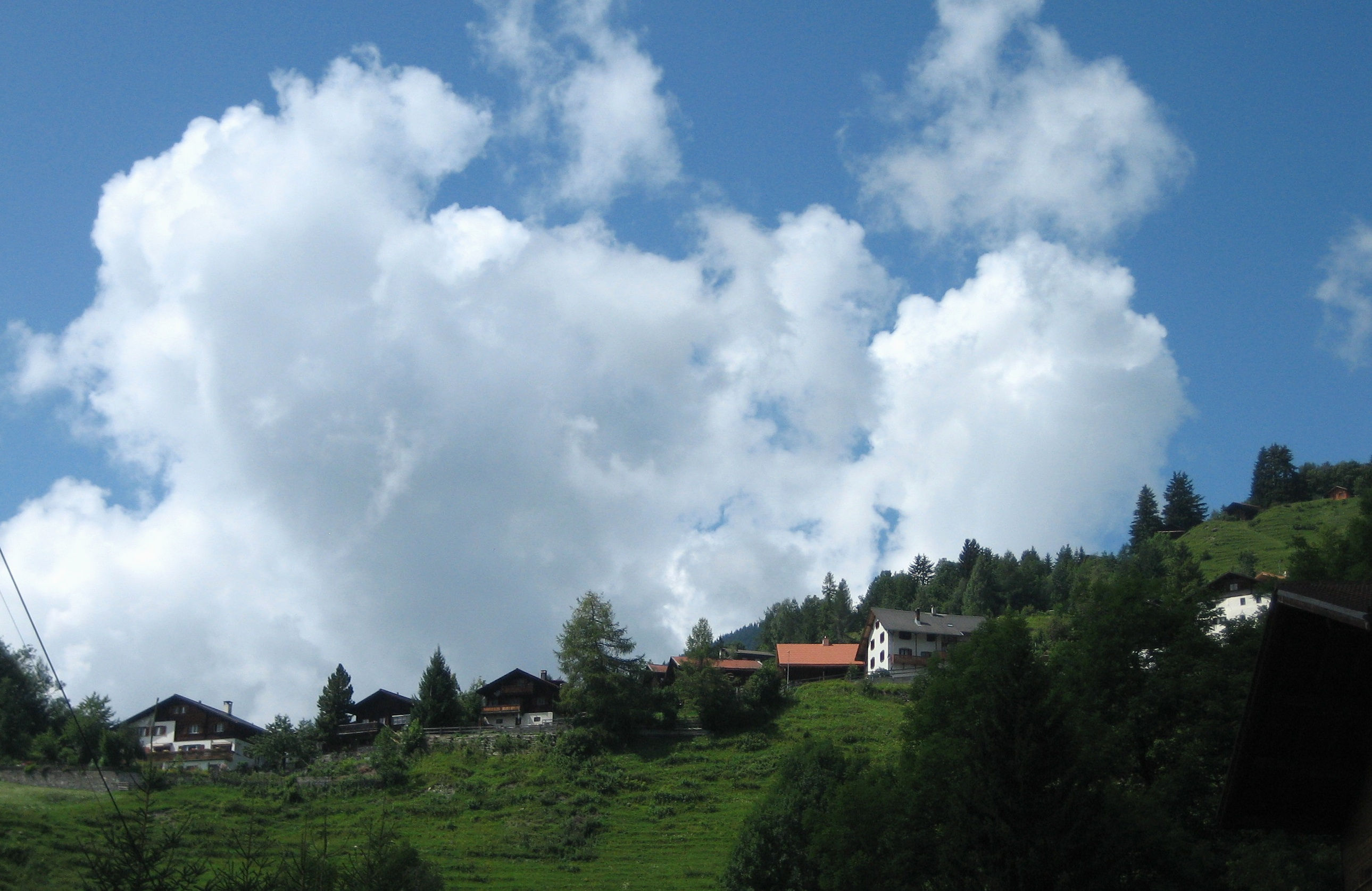
Pagig village

== Demographics ==
St. Peter-Pagig had a population (as of 2010) of 214.

St. Peter had a population (as of 2008) of 241. The historical population is given in the following table:

year	population
1808	272
1900	203
1950	240
2000	232
