= Peist railway station =

Railway station in Switzerland

Peist
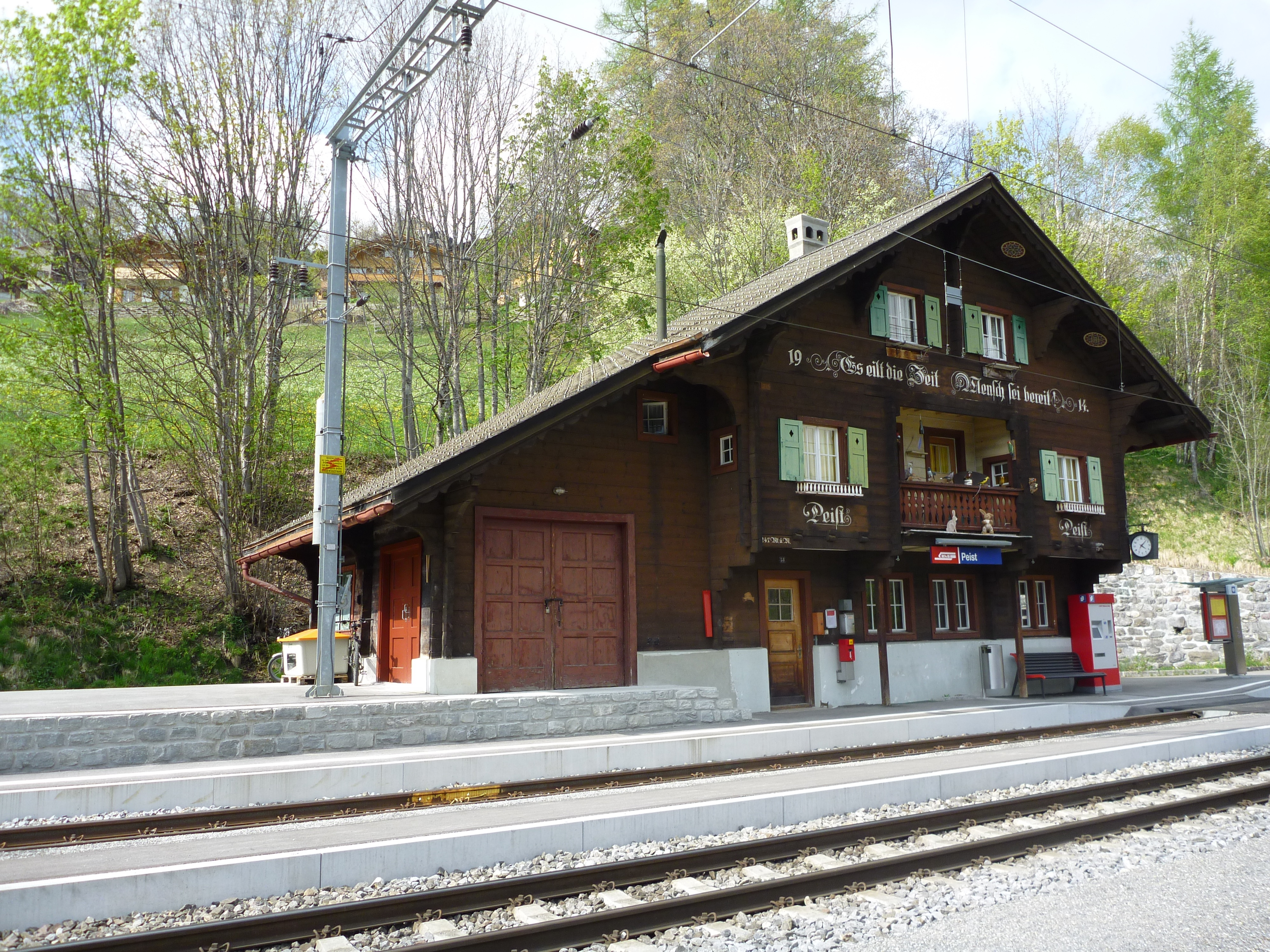
- The station building in 2010

General information
- Location: Arosa; Switzerland
- Coordinates: 46°49′46″N 9°40′18″E
- Elevation: 1,244 m (4,081 ft)
- Owner: Rhaetian Railway (since 1942); Chur-Arosa-Bahn (1914-1942)
- Line: Chur–Arosa line
- Distance: 14.353 kilometres (8.919 mi) from Chur
- Platforms: 2
- Train operators: Rhaetian Railway
- Connections: Postauto and local buses

Construction
- Architect: Alfons Rocco (1914)

History
- Opened: 12 December 1914

Services
Preceding station	Rhaetian Railway	Following station
St. Peter-Molinis towards Chur	R 16	Langwies GR towards Arosa
Location

Peist railway station is a railway station on the Chur–Arosa railway (the "Arosabahn") of the Rhaetian Railway (RhB). It is situated very near to Peist, in the municipality of Arosa.

== Services ==
As of the December 2023 timetable change, the following services stop at Peist:

- Regio: hourly service between Chur and Arosa.

Postauto bus service 90.041 terminates/begins at Peist's Schulhaus, which is slightly less than a kilometre (by road) from the station. The bus route serves (places listed from Peist): Sankt Peter, Pagig, Tura, Castiel, Calfreisen, Sax and Maladers, before entering Chur.
