= Peist =

- Former municipality
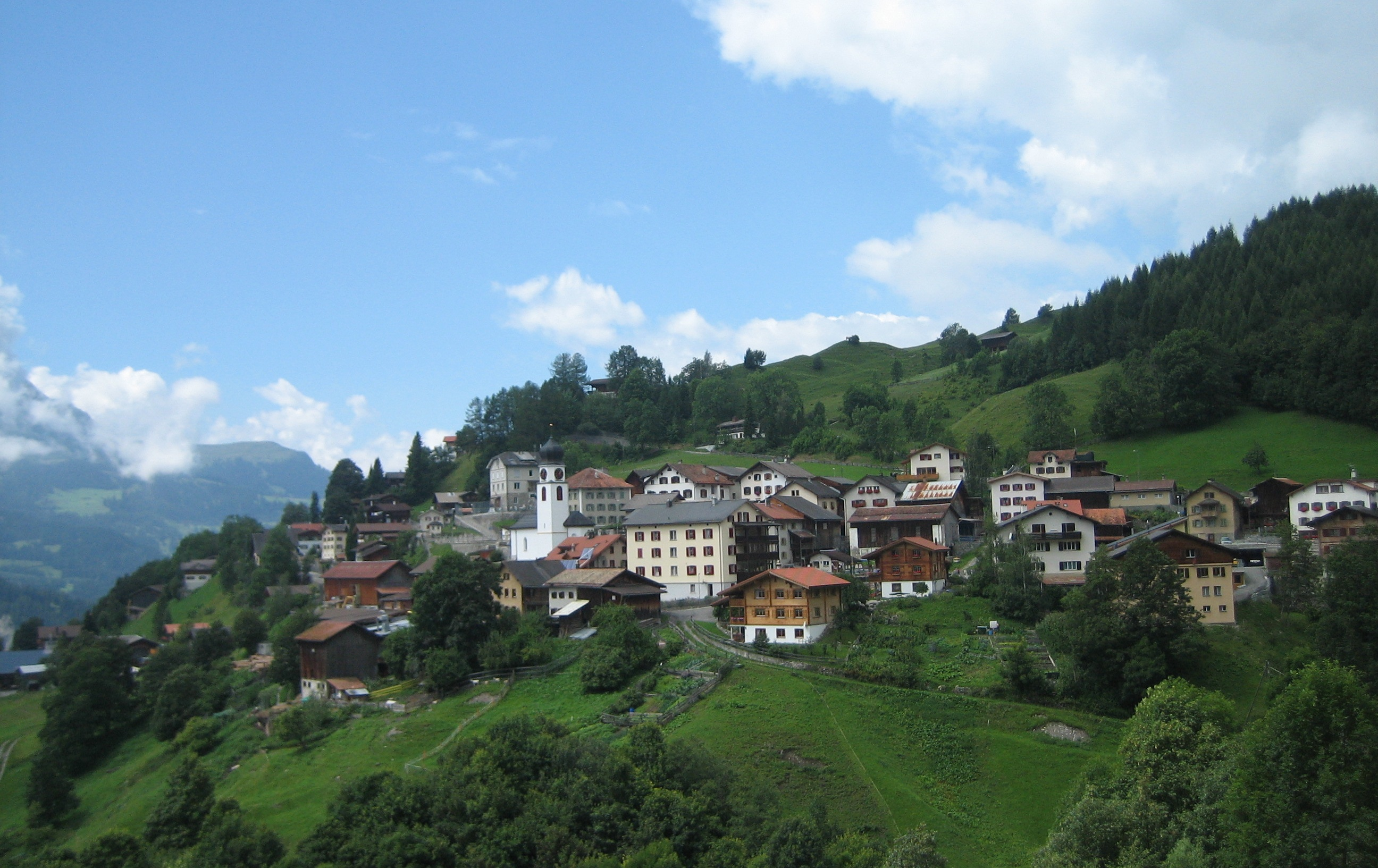

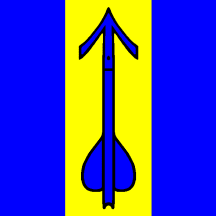
- Flag Coat of arms
- Location of Peist
- Location within Switzerland Location within Canton of Graubünden
- Coordinates: 46°50′N 9°40′E
- Country: Switzerland
- Canton: Graubünden
- District: Plessur

Area
  - Total: 7.93 km^{2} (3.06 sq mi)
- Elevation: 1,340 m (4,400 ft)

Population (2010)
  - Total: 209
  - Density: 26.4/km^{2} (68.3/sq mi)
- Time zone: UTC+01:00 (CET)
  - Summer (DST): UTC+02:00 (CEST)
- Postal code: 7029
- SFOS number: 3929
- ISO 3166 code: CH-GR
- Surrounded by: Arosa, Fideris, Furna, Jenaz, Langwies, Molinis, St. Peter-Pagig
- Website: SFSO statistics

Peist is a former municipality in the district of Plessur in the canton of Graubünden in Switzerland. On 1 January 2013 the former municipalities of Peist, Calfreisen, Castiel, Langwies, Lüen, Molinis and St. Peter-Pagig merged into the municipality of Arosa.

== History ==
Peist is first mentioned in 1084 as de Paiste.

== Geography ==
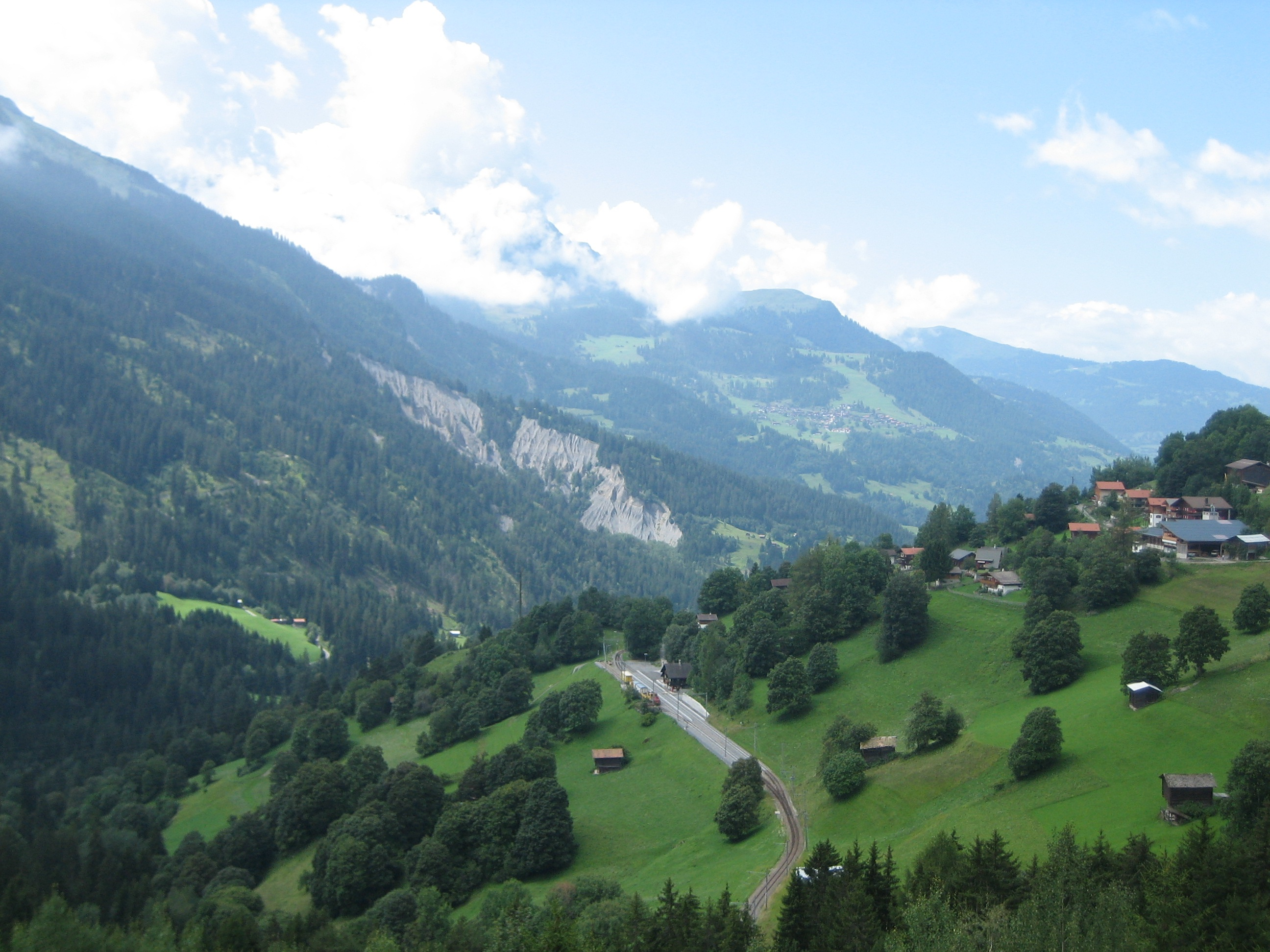
Schanfigg valley near Peist; the railway station is shown

Before the merger, Peist had a total area of 17.9 km^{2} (6.9 mi^{2}). Of this area, 57% is used for agricultural purposes, while 35.7% is forested. Of the rest of the land, 1.6% is settled (buildings or roads) and the remainder (5.7%) is non-productive (rivers, glaciers or mountains).

The former municipality is located in the Schanfigg sub-district of the Plessur district. It consists of the linear village of Peist on the northern slope of the mid-Schanfigg.

Nearby is the Peist railway station, on the Chur-Arosa railway line.

== Demographics ==
Peist had a population (as of 2010) of 209. As of 2008, 4.0% of the population was made up of foreign nationals. Over the last 10 years the population has decreased at a rate of -7%. Most of the population (as of 2000) speaks German (93.4%), with Portuguese being second most common ( 3.1%) and Italian being third ( 1.3%).

As of 2000, the distribution of the sexes in the population was 49.3% male and 50.7% female. The age distribution, as of 2000, in Peist is; 41 children or 17.9% of the population are between 0 and 9 years old and 27 teenagers or 11.8% are between 10 and 19. Of the adult population, 15 people or 6.6% of the population are between 20 and 29 years old. 43 people or 18.8% are between 30 and 39, 23 people or 10.0% are between 40 and 49, and 21 people or 9.2% are between 50 and 59. The senior population distribution is 35 people or 15.3% of the population are between 60 and 69 years old, 17 people or 7.4% are between 70 and 79, there are 7 people or 3.1% who are between 80 and 89.

In the 2007 federal election the most popular party was the SVP which received 53.2% of the vote. The next three most popular parties were the SP (24.8%), the FDP (11.1%) and the CVP (7.2%).

In Peist about 69.4% of the population (between age 25–64) have completed either non-mandatory upper secondary education or additional higher education (either university or a Fachhochschule).

Peist has an unemployment rate of 2.54%. As of 2005, there were 25 people employed in the primary economic sector and about 11 businesses involved in this sector. 39 people are employed in the secondary sector and there are 5 businesses in this sector. 8 people are employed in the tertiary sector, with 5 businesses in this sector.

The historical population is given in the following table:

year	population
1780	312
1850	236
1900	160
1950	180
2000	229
