= Molinis =

- Former municipality
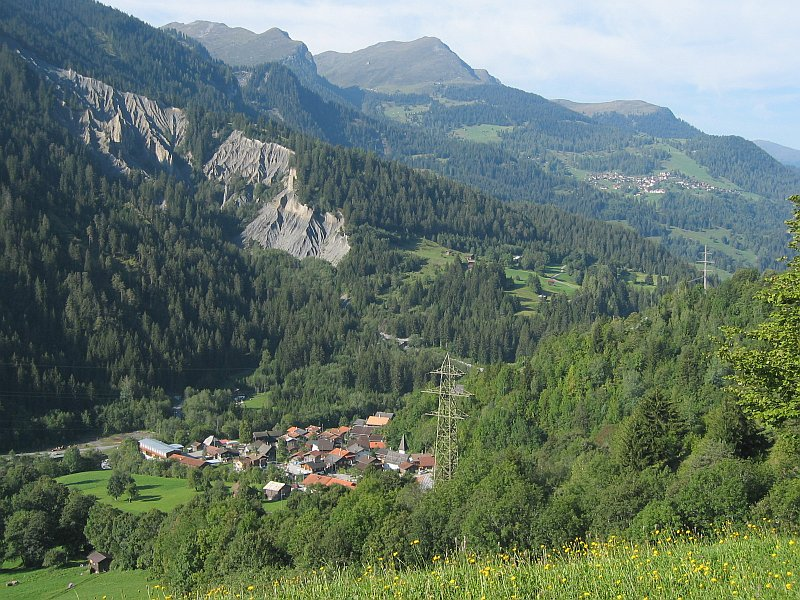
- Molinis village

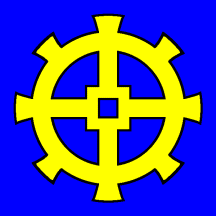
- Flag Coat of arms
- Location of Molinis
- Location within Switzerland Location within Canton of Graubünden
- Coordinates: 46°50′N 9°39′E
- Country: Switzerland
- Canton: Graubünden
- District: Plessur

Area
  - Total: 13.24 km^{2} (5.11 sq mi)
- Elevation: 1,041 m (3,415 ft)

Population (2010)
  - Total: 132
  - Density: 9.97/km^{2} (25.8/sq mi)
- Time zone: UTC+01:00 (CET)
  - Summer (DST): UTC+02:00 (CEST)
- Postal code: 7056
- SFOS number: 3927
- ISO 3166 code: CH-GR
- Surrounded by: Arosa, Peist, St. Peter-Pagig, Tschiertschen
- Website: SFSO statistics

Molinis is a former municipality in the district of Plessur in the canton of Graubünden in Switzerland. On 1 January 2013 the former municipalities of Molinis, Calfreisen, Castiel, Langwies, Lüen, Peist and St. Peter-Pagig merged into the municipality of Arosa.

== History ==
Molinis is first mentioned in 1335 as Mulina. Formerly, in Romansh, it was known as Molinas.

== Geography ==
Before the merger, Molinis had a total area of 13.2 km^{2} (5.1 mi^{2}). Of this area, 26.7% is used for agricultural purposes, while 60.8% is forested. Of the rest of the land, 1.4% is settled (buildings or roads) and the remainder (11%) is non-productive (rivers, glaciers or mountains).

The former municipality is located in the Schanfigg sub-district of the Plessur district, on the Schanfigg valley floor. It consists of the haufendorf village (an irregular, unplanned and quite closely packed village, built around a central square) of Molinis.

Nearby is the Sankt Peter-Molinis railway station, on the Chur-Arosa railway line, which also serves Sankt Peter.

== Demographics ==
Molinis had a population (as of 2010) of 132. As of 2008, 12.7% of the population was made up of foreign nationals. Over the last 10 years the population has decreased at a rate of −20.4%. Most of the population (as of 2000) speaks German (97.8%), with Romansh being second most common (1.5%) and Spanish being third (0.7%).

As of 2000, the gender distribution of the population was 52.7% male and 47.3% female. The age distribution, as of 2000, in Molinis is; 20 children or 14.7% of the population are between 0 and 9 years old and 22 teenagers or 16.2% are between 10 and 19. Of the adult population, 7 people or 5.1% of the population are between 20 and 29 years old. 25 people or 18.4% are between 30 and 39, 20 people or 14.7% are between 40 and 49, and 9 people or 6.6% are between 50 and 59. The senior population distribution is 13 people or 9.6% of the population are between 60 and 69 years old, 16 people or 11.8% are between 70 and 79, there are 4 people or 2.9% who are between 80 and 89.

In the 2007 federal election the most popular party was the SVP which received 55.7% of the vote. The next three most popular parties were the SP (29.8%), the FDP (7.7%) and the CVP (5.5%).

In Molinis about 73.4% of the population (between ages 25 and 64) have completed either non-mandatory upper secondary education or additional higher education (either university or a Fachhochschule).

Molinis has an unemployment rate of 0.79%. As of 2005, there were 10 people employed in the primary economic sector and about 4 businesses involved in this sector. 10 people are employed in the secondary sector and there are 5 businesses in this sector. 24 people are employed in the tertiary sector, with 6 businesses in this sector.

The historical population is given in the following table:

year	population
1850	135
1900	106
1950	137
1980	83
2000	136
