= Lüen-Castiel railway station =

Railway station in Switzerland

Lüen-Castiel
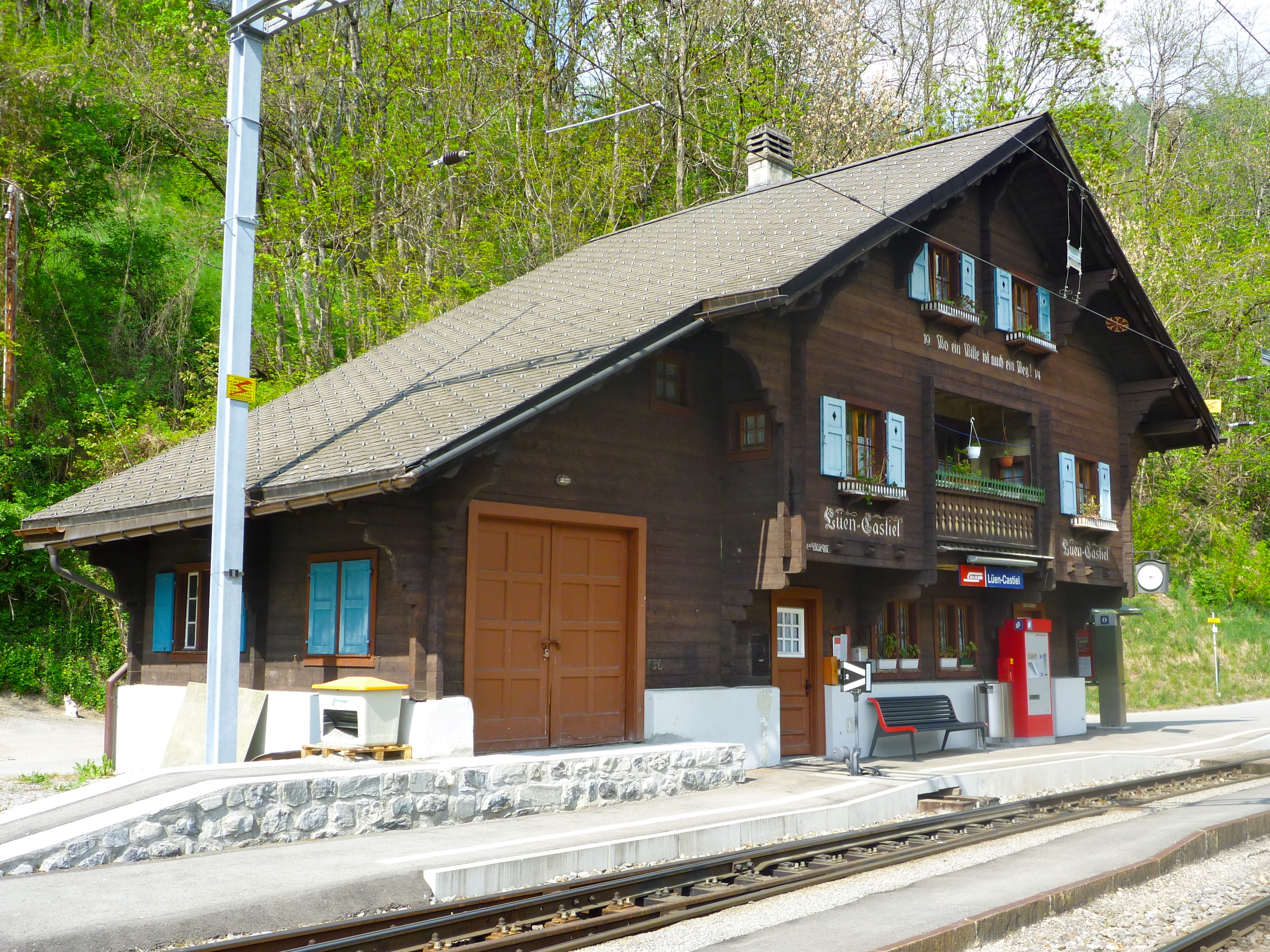
- The station in 2010

General information
- Location: Bahnhof 46; Arosa; Switzerland
- Coordinates: 46°49′54″N 9°36′48″E
- Elevation: 938 m (3,077 ft)
- Owner: Rhaetian Railway (since 1942); Chur-Arosa-Bahn (1914-1942)
- Line: Chur–Arosa line
- Distance: 8.727 kilometres (5.423 mi) from Chur
- Platforms: 2
- Train operators: Rhaetian Railway
- Connections: Local buses

Construction
- Architect: Alfons Rocco (1914)

History
- Opened: 12 December 1914

Services
Preceding station	Rhaetian Railway	Following station
Chur Altstadt towards Chur	R 16	St. Peter-Molinis towards Arosa
Location

Lüen-Castiel railway station is a railway station on the Chur–Arosa railway (the "Arosabahn") of the Rhaetian Railway (RhB). It is situated in Lüen and also serves nearby Castiel.

A short distance to the west of the station, in the direction of Chur, is the Castielertobel Viaduct, which, after the Langwieser Viaduct and the Gründjitobel Viaduct, is the third-largest bridge on the Arosa line.

== Services ==
As of the December 2023 timetable change, the following services stop at Lüen-Castiel:

- Regio: hourly service between Chur and Arosa.
