= St. Peter-Molinis railway station =

Railway station in Switzerland

St. Peter-Molinis
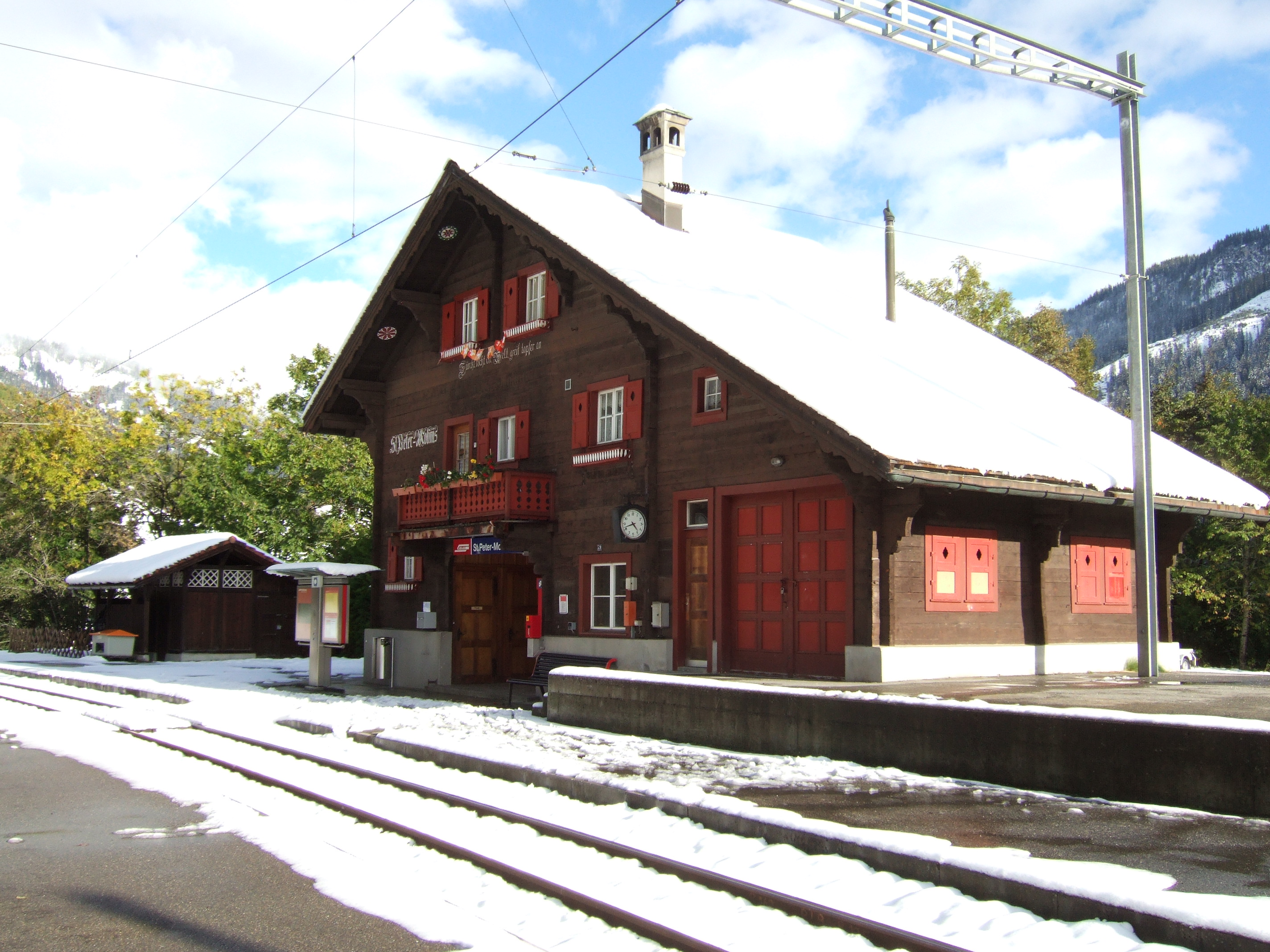
- The station building in autumn snow, 2011

General information
- Location: Arosa; Switzerland
- Coordinates: 46°49′45″N 9°39′14″E
- Elevation: 1,157 m (3,796 ft)
- Owner: Rhaetian Railway (since 1942); Chur-Arosa-Bahn (1914-1942)
- Line: Chur–Arosa line
- Distance: 12.722 kilometres (7.905 mi) from Chur
- Platforms: 2
- Train operators: Rhaetian Railway
- Connections: Local buses

Construction
- Architect: Alfons Rocco (1914)

History
- Opened: 12 December 1914

Services
Preceding station	Rhaetian Railway	Following station
Lüen-Castiel towards Chur	R 16	Peist towards Arosa
Location

St. Peter-Molinis railway station is a Swiss railway station on the Chur–Arosa railway (the "Arosabahn") of the Rhaetian Railway (RhB). It is situated between the villages of Molinis and St. Peter, both within the municipality of Arosa, though slightly nearer to Molinis.

== Services ==
As of the December 2023 timetable change, the following services stop at St. Peter-Molinis:

- Regio: hourly service between Chur and Arosa.
