= Castielertobel Viaduct =

Castielertobel Viaduct Castielertobel-Viadukt
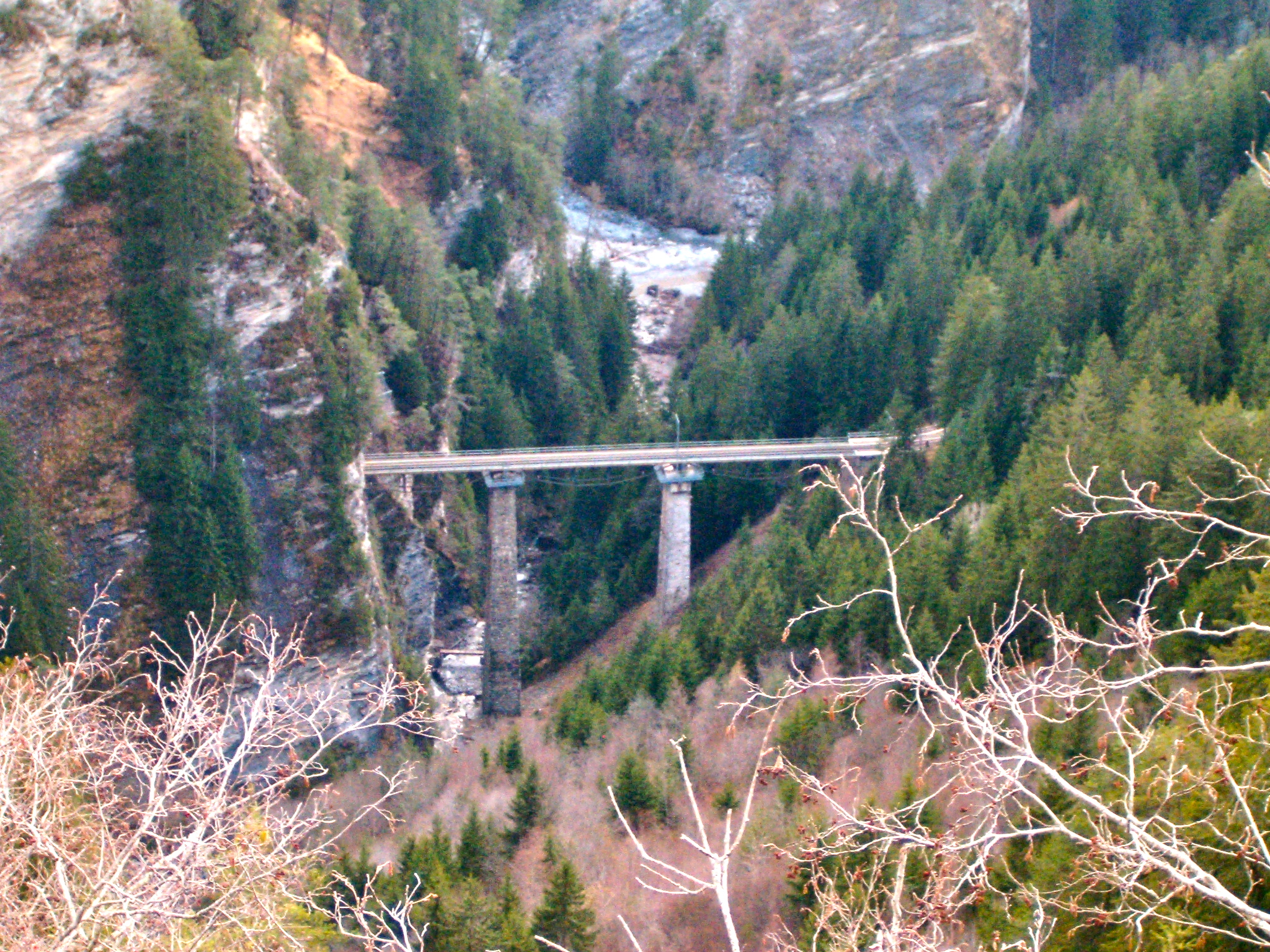
- View from the nearby cantonal road
- Coordinates: 46°50′07″N 09°35′36″E
- Carries: Rhaetian Railway
- Crosses: Castielertobelbach
- Locale: Castiel and Calfreisen, Switzerland
- Official name: Castielertobel-Viadukt
- Owner: Rhaetian Railway
- Maintained by: Rhaetian Railway

Characteristics
- Design: Arch (1914); Fish belly truss bridge (1942)
- Material: Stone (1914); Iron (1942)
- Total length: 115 m (377 ft)
- Height: 53 m (174 ft)
- Longest span: 25 m (82 ft)
- No. of spans: 3

History
- Construction start: Early 1913
- Construction end: Late 1913
- Opened: December 1914
- Closed: May 13, 2024 (demolished)

Location
- Interactive map of Castielertobel Viaduct

The Castielertobel Viaduct (Note: The viaduct is sometimes confusingly described as the Castielertobel Bridge - a confusing description because there is a nearby road bridge of that name.) (German: Castielertobel-Viadukt) was a single track railway bridge spanning the Castielertobelbach, and linking the municipalities of Castiel and Calfreisen, in the Canton of Graubünden, Switzerland. It was built between 1913 and 1914 for the Chur–Arosa railway, and was owned and used by the Rhaetian Railway.

It was demolished on 13 May 2024, and its replacement was already built, and waiting near the old bridge, designed to slide into place within two weeks. The replacement is a single span steel construction designed to shorten by up to 1.5 metres (4 ft 11 in) over the predicted 100 year life of the bridge.

== Location ==
The viaduct was located on the Rhaetian Railway's metre gauge line from Chur to the holiday and recreation resort of Arosa (the Chur–Arosa line), and linked Calfreisen with Castiel, just to the west of the Lüen-Castiel railway station.

After the Langwieser Viaduct and the Gründjitobel Viaduct, the Castielertobel Viaduct was the third largest bridge on the Arosa line. It spans the Castielertobel, a wild and deeply eroded Bündner schist gorge, and the Castielertobelbach. In similar fashion to the Landwasser Viaduct on the Rhaetian Railway's Albula Railway, the viaduct led directly into a tunnel portal, where the Arosa line dove into the 249 metres (817 ft) long S-shaped Bärenfalle-Tunnel.

== History ==
=== The original stone and concrete bridge ===
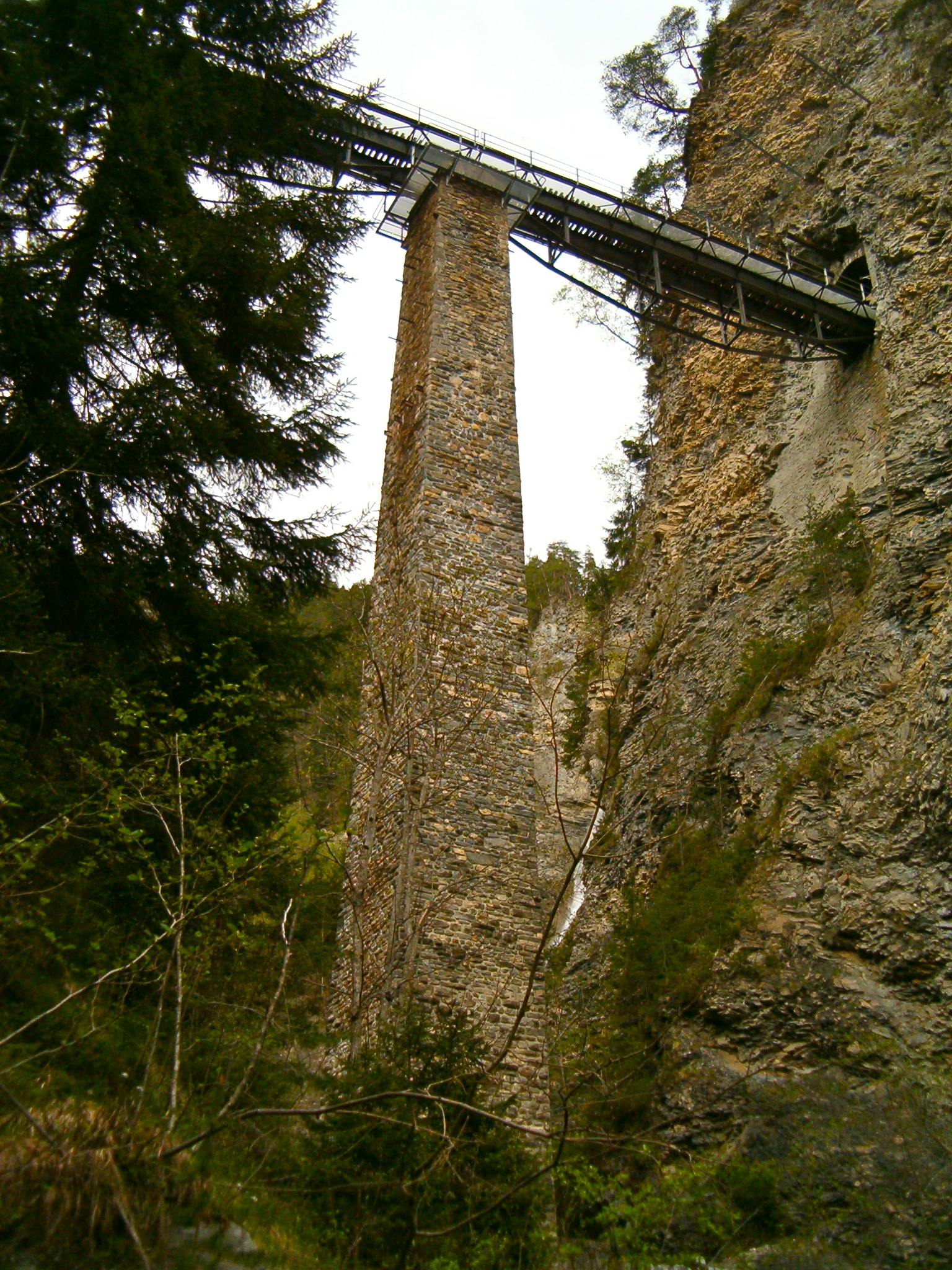
One of the concrete-cored stone pillars of the original railway viaduct

Due to the difficult geological conditions in the Schanfigg valley, a total of 18 tunnels and 40 bridges needed to be created between 1912 and 1914 for the privately built Arosa line.

Like most of the other bridges on the line, the Castielertobel Viaduct was constructed in the classical manner, and mainly of stone. However, the special site conditions dictated the inclusion of stampfbeton (unreinforced concrete compressed by stamping) in the cores of the stone pillars.

In light of the spectacular, and topographically extremely difficult, rises and falls of the Castielertobel (the so-called Bärenfalle, or bear traps, which, despite being relatively close to the nearby cantonal road, were almost unknown before the Arosa line was constructed), the engineers had to resort to using fire and smoke signals to help them survey the line's route. During construction of the viaduct, access was provided to the construction site from Sassal via Calfreisertobel, on makeshift tracks laid over the already completed railway formation. Horses pulled the necessary materials to the construction site on transporter wagons.

The construction of the Bärenfalle-Tunnel was begun from Eichwald, uphill from Castiel. The tunnel constructors made their breakthrough while both of the viaduct's pillars were still under construction.

Despite the viaduct's construction challenges, the viaduct building process itself was surprisingly trouble free: although the main pillars were begun only in April 1913, the whole viaduct, including its deck, was complete by November of the same year. By contrast, a potential rock fall at the uphill portal of the Bärenfalle-Tunnel threatened to block passage through the tunnel just at the moment when transport of machinery to the Lüen power station was due to begin.

=== Stabilisation and reconstruction measures ===
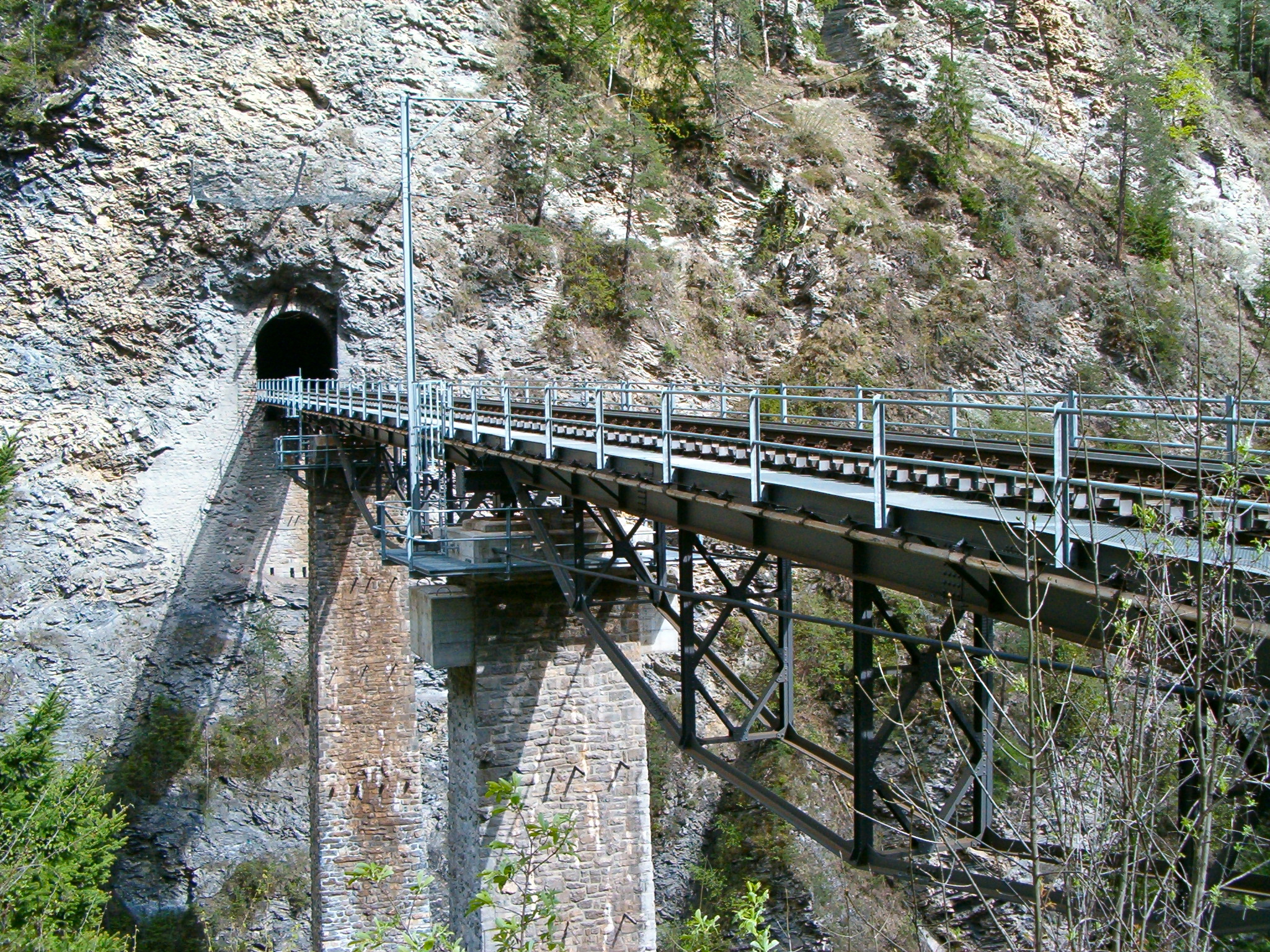
The spans of the viaduct, showing the "fish bellied" girders

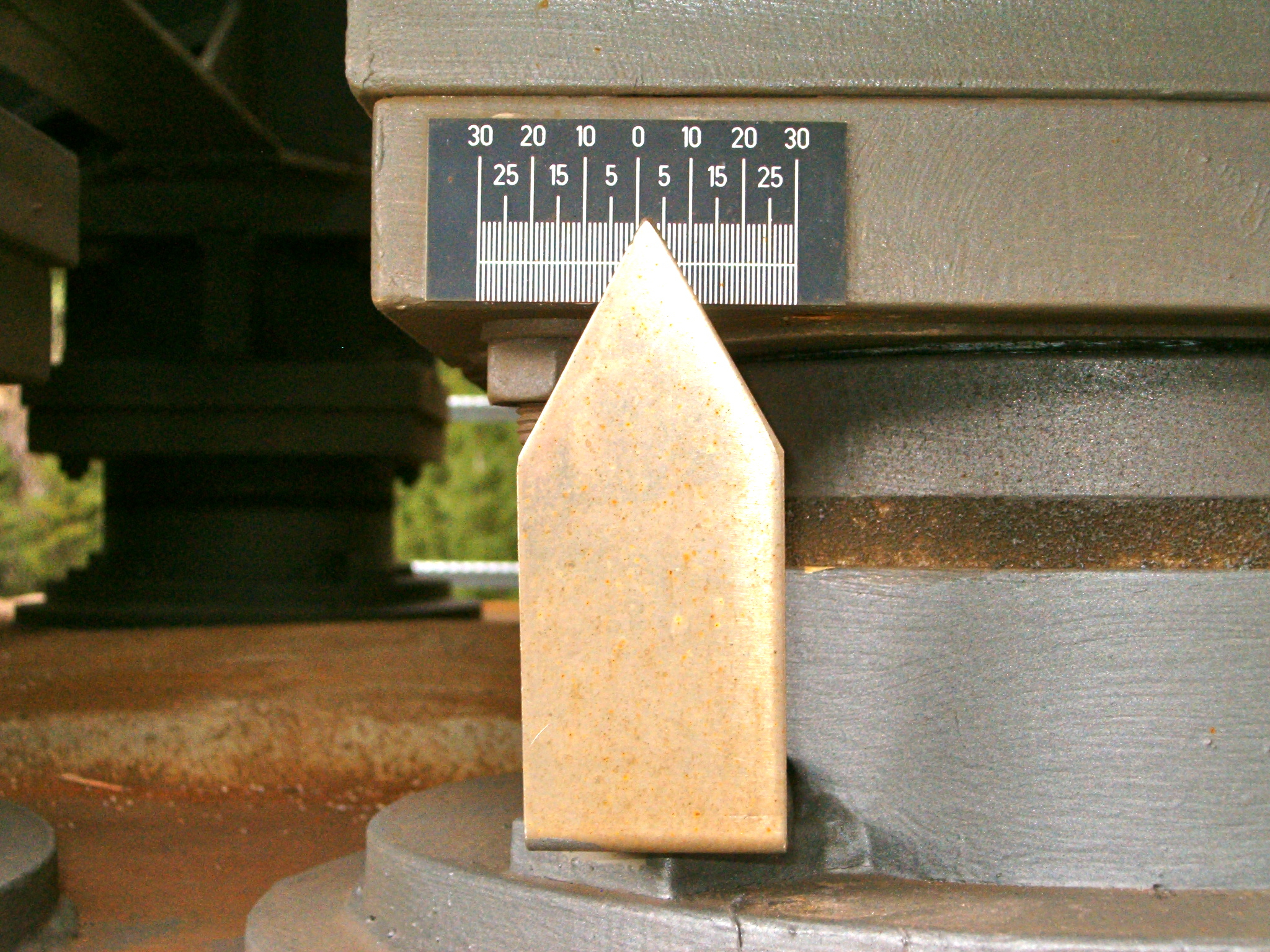
Monitoring device on the viaduct

The site conditions soon proved to be very unfavourable to the completed viaduct, with the result that the 53-metre (174 ft) high main pillars slipped each year by about 6 millimetres (0.24 in) downstream towards the Plessur River. Relatively quickly, this led to considerable deformation of the vaulting.

In 1931, following many observations and detailed investigations, work therefore began on an initial reconstruction of the viaduct. The work was carried out by the firm B. & C. Caprez. During that work, the valley side abutment was underpinned by a bell-shaped concrete block, which was clad with Hunziker stones, and reinforced with rails. The block had a diameter of 14 metres (46 ft) and a height of 9 metres (30 ft). Additionally, a new foundation base was laid some 21 metres (69 ft) below the previous ground level.

It soon turned out that these measures were not sufficient. In 1942, the entire bridge structure was therefore rebuilt. All three of the stone arches were removed and replaced by iron girders, to overcome the viaduct's previous vulnerability to landslides and associated deformations. Installation of underlying "fish-bellied" girders maximised stability. Chief engineer Hans Conrad headed up this transformation, without any need for the railway operations to be interrupted.

From its 1942 reconstruction until 2024, its special design had compensated for slipping movements, which could not be eliminated, even by modern engineering measures. A monitoring device attached to the viaduct made it possible to register even the slightest shifts. Additionally, a 7-tonne (6.9-long-ton; 7.7-short-ton) counterweight suspended from a wire rope provided a 50-tonne (49-long-ton; 55-short-ton) pulling effect on the pier heads, along the line of the railway formation towards Chur.

=== Demolition ===
In 2019 inspectors found serious structural failures in the steel structure and the decision was made to demolish the viaduct and replace it instead of attempting repairs. On 13 May 2024 demolition was completed using explosives. Controversy emerged as it was found that while local government had approved the use of explosives, an earlier federal environmental review had denied the use of explosives and the demolition may therefore been illegal.

== Technical data ==
The Castielertobel Viaduct was 115 metres (377 ft) long. Its main span was 25 metres (82 ft) long, and had a rise of 53 metres (174 ft). The viaduct had a total of three spans.

== See also ==
- Arch bridge
- Truss bridge
- Viaduct
- Lüen-Castiel (Rhaetian Railway station)
- Gründjitobel Viaduct
- Langwieser Viaduct
- Chur–Arosa railway
- Rhaetian Railway
