= St. Peter, Switzerland =

St. Peter
- Former municipality
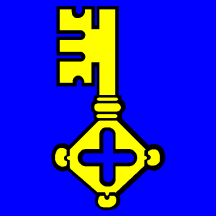
- Flag Coat of arms
- Location of St. Peter
- Location within Switzerland Location within Canton of Graubünden
- Coordinates: 46°50′N 9°38′E
- Country: Switzerland
- Canton: Graubünden
- District: Plessur

Area
  - Total: 6.88 km^{2} (2.66 sq mi)
- Elevation: 688 m (2,257 ft)

Population (December 2007)
  - Total: 168
  - Density: 24.4/km^{2} (63.2/sq mi)
- Time zone: UTC+01:00 (CET)
  - Summer (DST): UTC+02:00 (CEST)
- Postal code: 7028
- SFOS number: 3930
- ISO 3166 code: CH-GR
- Website: www.st-peter.ch

St. Peter (Romansh: Son Peder) is a village in the district of Plessur in the canton of Graubünden, Switzerland. An independent municipality before, it merged on 1 January 2008 with neighboring Pagig to form the municipality of St. Peter-Pagig.

== History ==
St. Peter is first referred to as a village in the late Middle Ages. The village church is first mentioned in 831. The church and the village section of Laeschgas belonged to Pfäfers Abbey.

== Geography ==
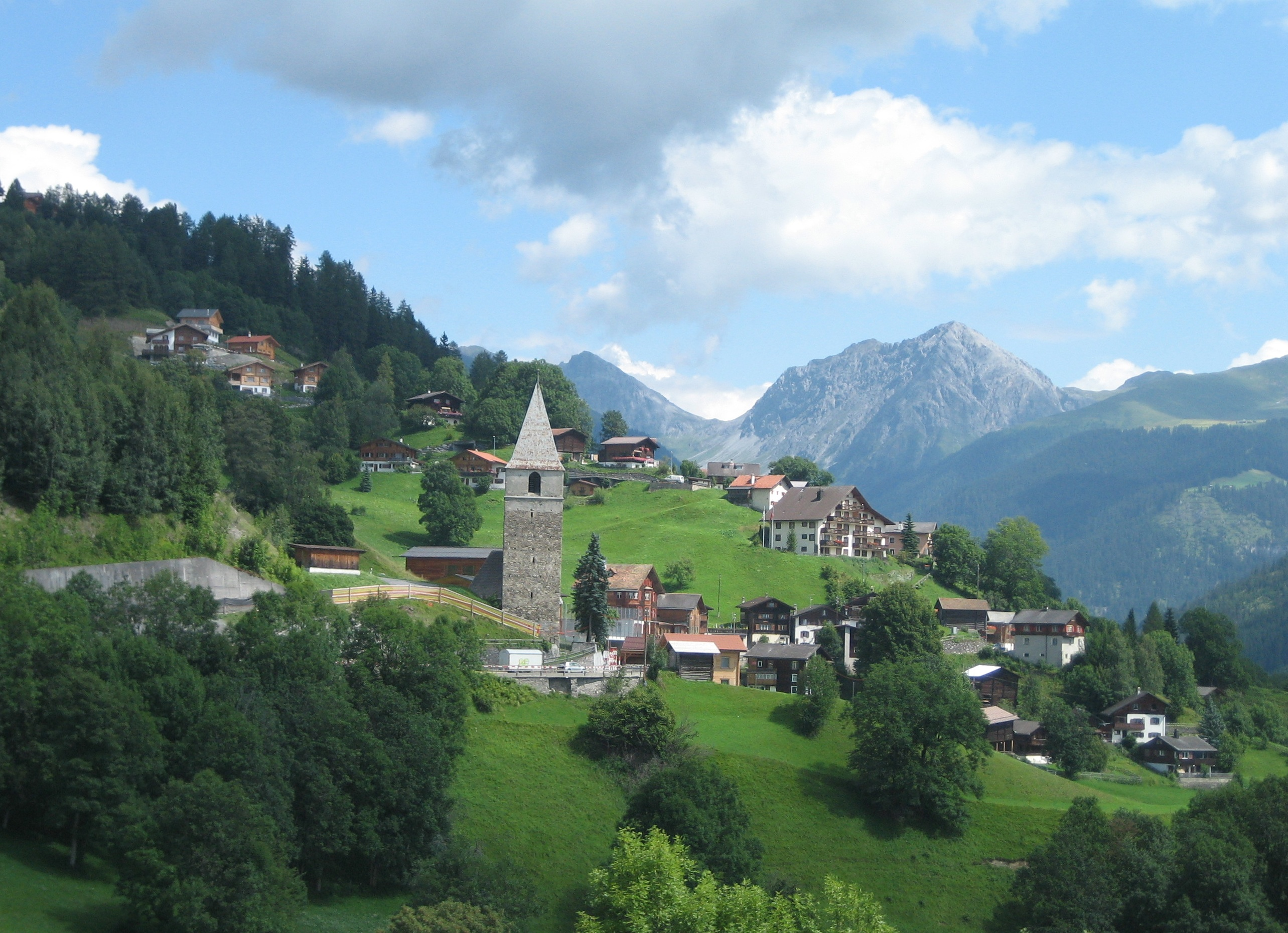
St Peter village

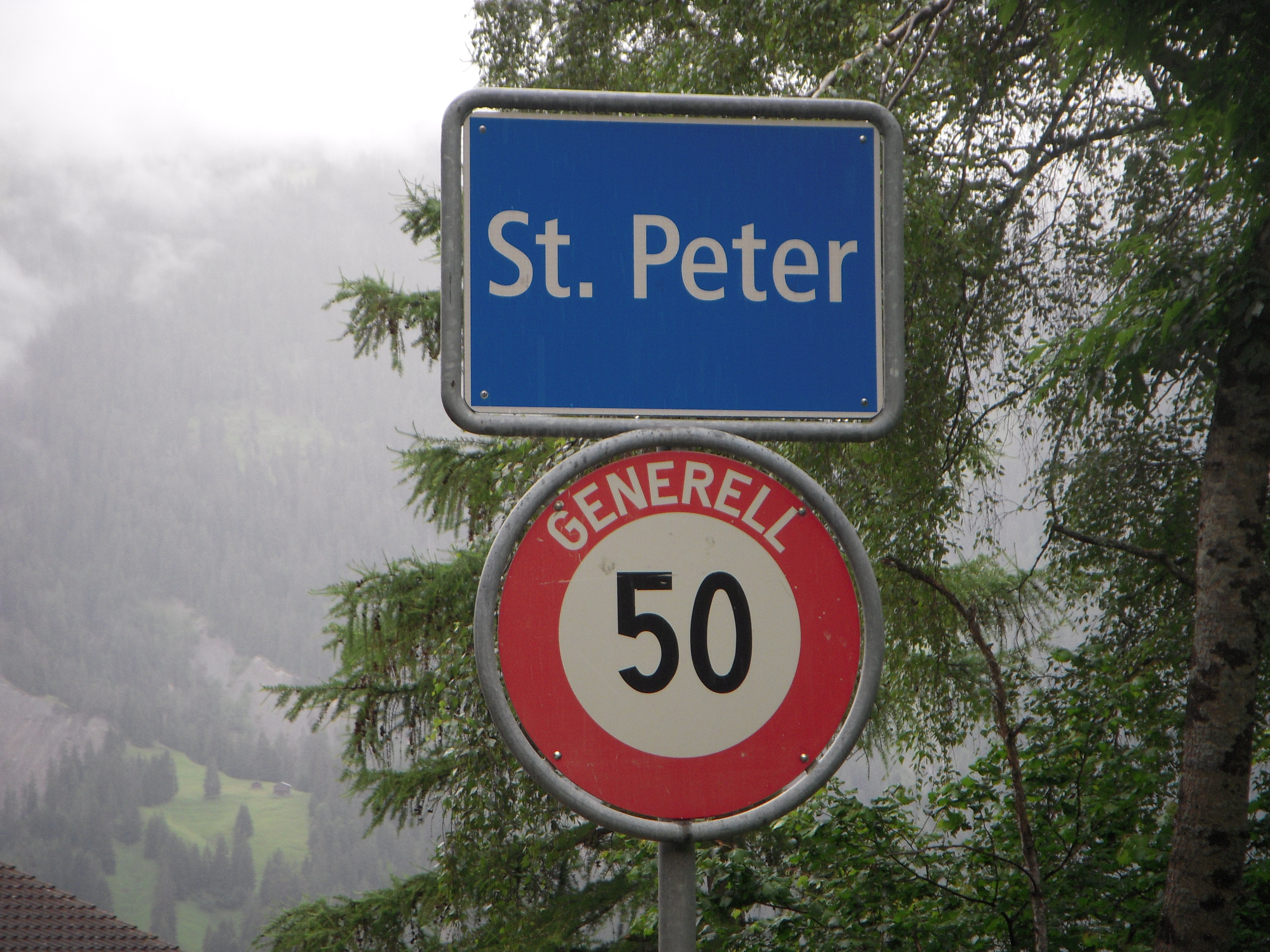
Is St. Peter living here?

St. Peter has an area, as of 2006, of 6.9 km^{2} (2.7 sq mi). Of this area, 61% is used for agricultural purposes, while 30.1% is forested. Of the rest of the land, 4.2% is settled (buildings or roads) and the remainder (4.7%) is non-productive (rivers, glaciers or mountains).

The village is located in the Schanfigg sub-district of the Plessur district in the northern slope of the mid-Schanfigg at an elevation of 1,160 m (3,810 ft). It consists of the village of St. Peter which is made up of two sections. In 2008 St. Peter merged with Pagig to form St. Peter-Pagig.

Nearby is the Sankt Peter-Molinis railway station, on the Chur-Arosa railway line, which also serves Molinis.

== Demographics ==
St. Peter has a population (as of 2007) of 168, of which 15.5% are foreign nationals. Over the last 10 years the population has grown at a rate of 8.4%. Most of the population (as of 2000) speaks German (95.5%), with Albanian being second most common ( 2.6%) and French being third ( 0.6%).

As of 2000, the gender distribution of the population was 54.2% male and 45.8% female. The age distribution, as of 2004, in St. Peter is; 7 children or 4.5% of the population are between 0 and 9 years old and 16 teenagers or 10.4% are between 10 and 19. Of the adult population, 13 people or 8.4% of the population are between 20 and 29 years old. 15 people or 9.7% are between 30 and 39, 25 people or 16.2% are between 40 and 49, and 26 people or 16.9% are between 50 and 59. The senior population distribution is 27 people or 17.5% of the population are between 60 and 69 years old, 19 people or 12.3% are between 70 and 79, there are 4 people or 2.6% who are between 80 and 89 there are 2 people or 1.3% who are between 90 and 99.

In the 2007 federal election the most popular party was the SVP which received 67.9% of the vote. The next three most popular parties were the FDP (13.5%), the SP (9.3%) and the CVP (4.2%).

The entire Swiss population is generally well educated. In St. Peter about 67% of the population (between age 25–64) have completed either non-mandatory upper secondary education or additional higher education (either University or a Fachhochschule).

St. Peter has an unemployment rate of 0.43%. As of 2005, there were 6 people employed in the primary economic sector and about 2 businesses involved in this sector. 14 people are employed in the secondary sector and there are 3 businesses in this sector. 18 people are employed in the tertiary sector, with 9 businesses in this sector.

The historical population is given in the following table:

year	population
1808	197
1850	108
1900	115
1950	161
2000	154
