= Arosa (disambiguation) =

Arosa may refer to:

== By place ==
=== Switzerland ===
- Arosa is a municipality and Federal Statistical Office–defined town in the Swiss canton of Graubünden
- Arosa (Rhaetian Railway station), a railway station in Arosa, Graubünden, Switzerland
- EHC Arosa, a Swiss ice hockey team

=== Galicia ===
- Arosa SC, a football team based in Villagarcía de Arosa, Spain
- Isla de Arosa, an island municipality in Galicia, Spain
- Villanueva de Arosa, a municipality in Pontevedra, Galicia, Spain
- Villagarcía de Arosa, a municipality in Pontevedra, Galicia, Spain
- Ría de Arosa, an estuary in Galicia, Spain

== Other ==
- 1304 Arosa, an Asteroid
- SEAT Arosa, a city car manufactured by the Spanish automobile company SEAT
- Arosa Line, a transatlantic shipping company.
- The Arousa Interglacial
