= Tschuggen Express =

Hotel funicular at Arosa, Graubünden, Switzerland

Coordinates: 46.779131°N 9.666666°E

Overview
- Status: In operation
- Owner: Tschuggen Hotel Group AG
- Locale: Arosa, Graubünden, Switzerland
- Termini: Arosa at Tschuggentorweg; Tschuggen
- Stations: 2

Service
- Type: funicular
- Operator(s): Arosa Bergbahnen AG
- Rolling stock: 2 coupled for 6 persons each
- Ridership: capacity: 120 persons/hour

History
- Opened: July 2018 (7 years ago)

Technical
- Line length: 535.54 m (1,757.0 ft)
- Number of tracks: 1
- Track gauge: 1,200 mm (3 ft 11 1/4 in)
- Electrification: from opening
- Operating speed: 4.0 metres per second (13 ft/s)
- Highest elevation: 2,004 m (6,575 ft)
- Maximum incline: ? % (average: 38%)

Tschuggen Express is a funicular railway in Arosa, Switzerland. It leads from Arosa at 1850 m to Tschuggen at 2004 m in the Arosa skiing area on Tschuggen (2049 m). The single-track line with a length of 535 m has an average incline of 38% and a difference of elevation of 154 m. The two circular cabins for 6 persons each are coupled and have level compensation.

The funicular is operated by Arosa Bergbahnen for the Tschuggen Hotel Group. It was completed by Steurer Seilbahnen in 2018, replacing a monorail installation from 2009 and reusing its stations.
