= Arosa Lenzerheide =

Ski area in Switzerland

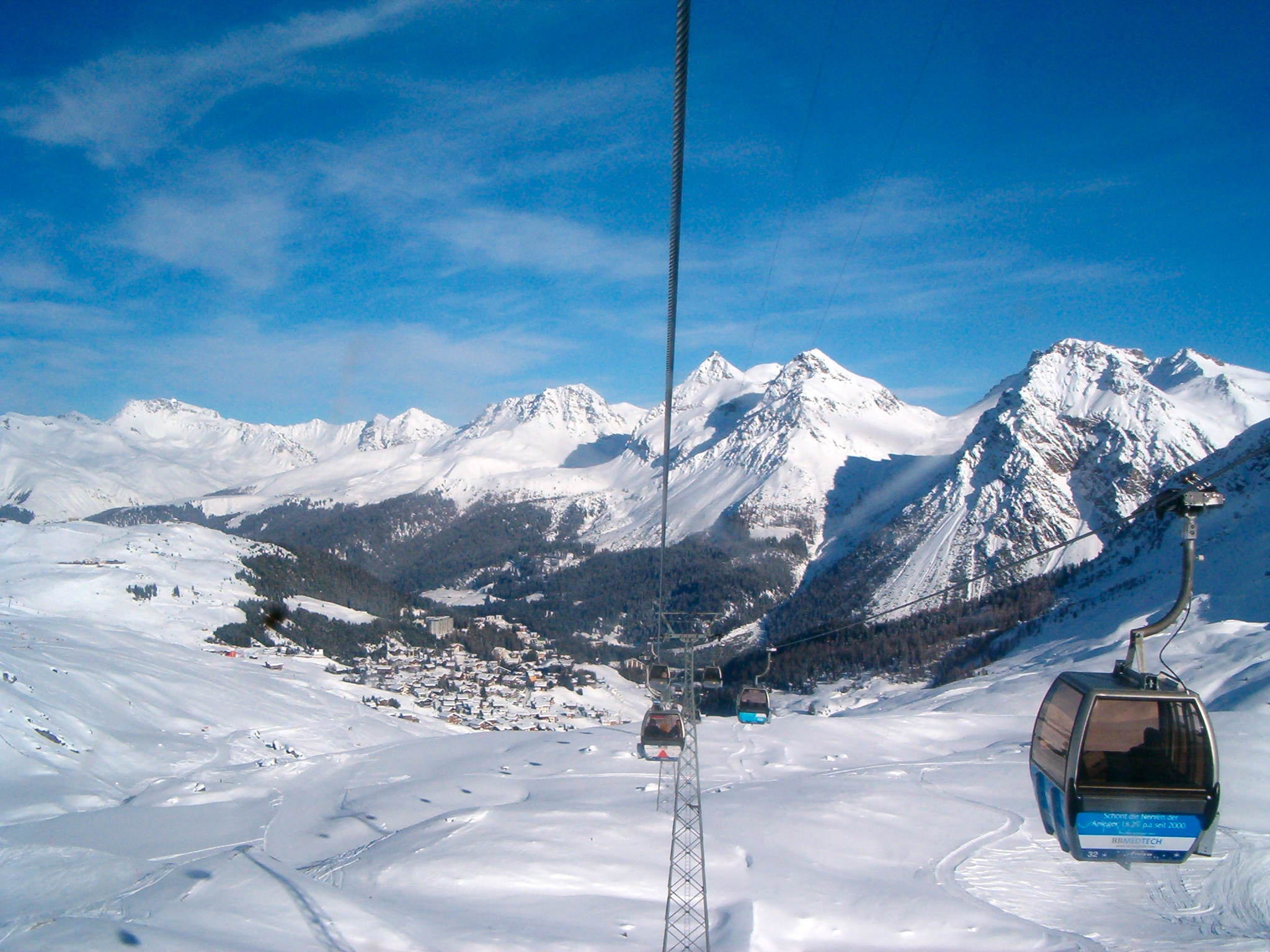

- Location within Alps Location within Switzerland
- Location: Arosa, Lenzerheide, Valbella, Parpan, Churwalden: Graubünden, South-Eastern Switzerland
- Coordinates: 46°46′07″N 09°36′40″E
- Trails: 225 km (140 mi): 111km - Easy; 87km - Intermediate; 27 - Difficult
- Lift system: 43 lifts
- Terrain parks: 4 parks 1 half pipe 1 ski cross course
- Website: Website

Arosa Lenzerheide is a ski area located in Arosa, Lenzerheide, Valbella, Parpan and Churwalden, Graubünden/Switzerland. It originated 2013/14 by connecting the existing ski areas of Arosa and Lenzerheide. With a total of 225 kilometers (140 miles) of ski slopes and 43 cable cars it is the largest contiguous ski area in Graubünden.

== Location and description ==
Arosa Lenzerheide is located in northern and central Grisons. It extends from the innermost Schanfigg via Urdental to the neighboring western valley with Lenzerheide, Parpan–Valbella and Churwalden. The ski area covers an altitudinal range of 1,230 to 2,865 m (4,035 to 9,400 ft). Outstanding summits with aerial tramways and panoramic restaurants are the Weisshorn and the Parpaner Rothorn which also marks the highest point of the ski area. 60 per cent of the slopes are groomed with artificial snow.

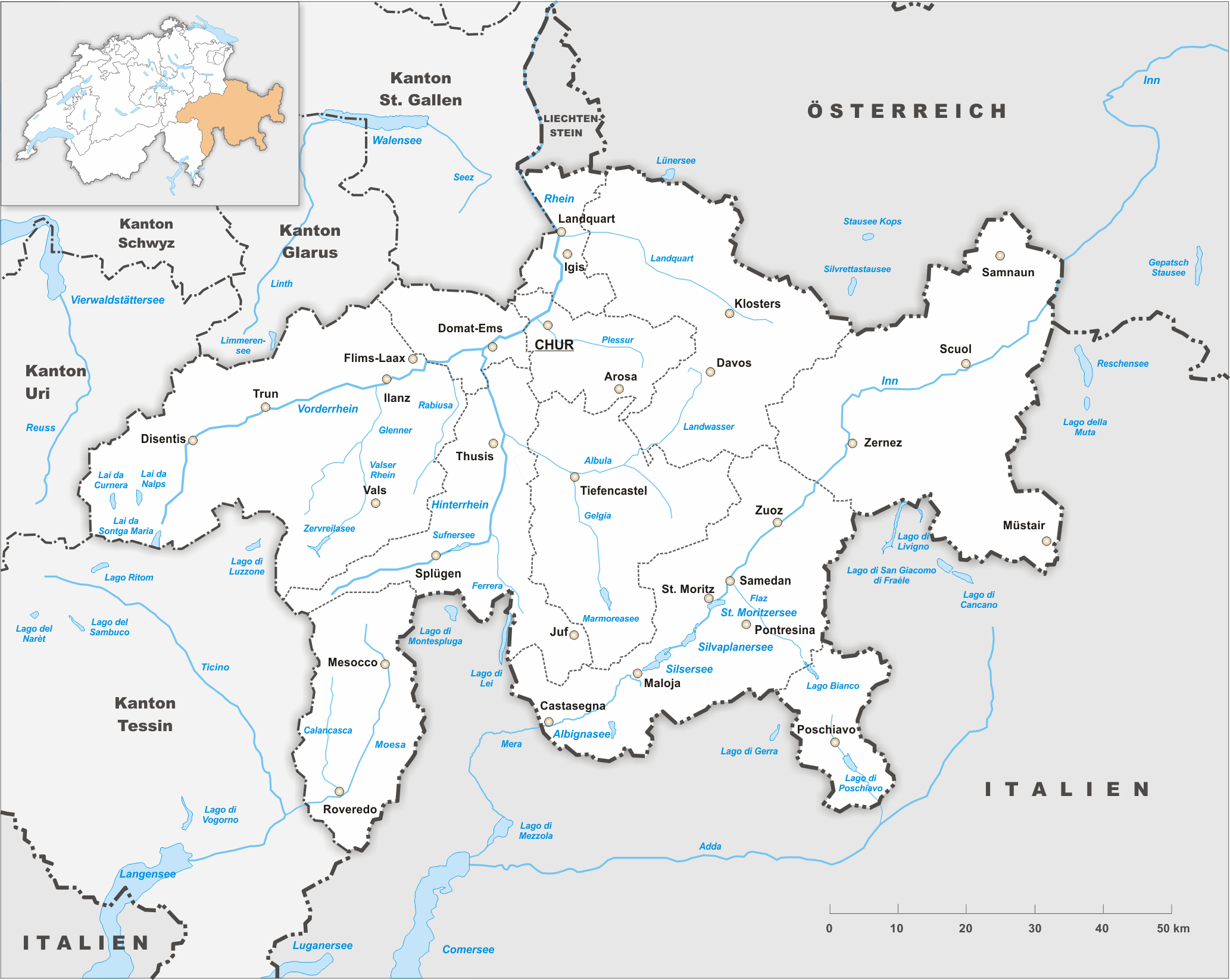
The Canton of Graubünden in South-Eastern Switzerland

Arosa Lenzerheide also offers more than 103 km (64 mi) of cross-country skiing trails and 4 terrain parks («Park'n'Pipe Tschuggen», «Wood Ranch» and «Bärensnowpark» in Arosa as well as «Jibarea Stätz» in Lenzerheide). In addition there are 11.5 km (7.1 mi) of sledding runs and 140 km (87 mi) of prepared winter hiking trails. In the summer season the region is a popular hiking and mountain biking resort.

Arosa and Lenzerheide are connected by a cable car called «Urdenbahn». This aerial tramway was built in 2013 and is located between the Arosa Hörnli and the Urdenfürggli on the Lenzerheide side. It is 1,682 metres (5,518 ft) long and surmounts just about 70 metres (230 ft) of altitude. The ski resort is operated mainly by Arosa Bergbahnen and Lenzerheide Bergbahnen.

== Ski lifts ==
A total of 43 ski lifts operate in Arosa Lenzerheide: 14 in Arosa, 12 in Lenzerheide east side (incl. Urdenbahn and chairlift Obertor), 13 in Lenzerheide west side (incl. chairlift Obertor) and 4 in Churwalden. There are 4 aerial tramways, 4 gondola lifts, 18 chair lifts (17 detachables) and 15 T-bars/button lifts:

Area	Lift name	Type	Length (m)	Manufacturer	Construction year (orig.)
Arosa	Weisshornbahn Section 1	Cable car	1237	Garaventa	1992 (1957)
Arosa	Weisshornbahn Section 2	Cable car	1963	Garaventa	1992 (1957)
Arosa	Urdenbahn	Cable car	1682	Steurer	2013
Arosa	Hörnli Express	6-man gondola lift	3108	WSO Städeli	1987 (1945)
Arosa	Kulm	4-man gondola lift	699	BMF Bartholet; WSO Städeli	2010 (1973/83)
Arosa	Tschuggen-Ost	3-man detachable chairlift	955	WSO Städeli	1983 (1938)
Arosa	Hörnli	4-man detachable chairlift	1236	Garaventa	1994 (1963)
Arosa	Carmenna	4-man detachable chairlift with bubble	2149	Garaventa	2000 (1938)
Arosa	Plattenhorn	4-man detachable chairlift with bubble	1470	Garaventa	2002 (1966)
Arosa	Brüggerhorn	6-man detachable chairlift with bubble	1287	BMF Bartholet	2019 (1938/70)
Arosa	Tomeli	T-bar	687	Oehler	1960
Arosa	Tschuggen-West	T-bar	463	WSO Städeli	1972
Arosa	Ried	T-bar	440	WSO Städeli	1976
Arosa	Prätschli	T-bar	295	Garaventa	1998
Arosa	Tschuggen Express	funicular	535	Steurer, Carvatech	2018 (2009)
Lenzerheide (east side)	Rothornbahn Section 1	8-man gondola lift	1331	Garaventa	2010 (1963)
Lenzerheide (east side)	Rothornbahn Section 2	Cable car	2069	Garaventa	1988 (1963)
Lenzerheide (east side)	Urdenbahn	Cable car	1682	Steurer	2013
Lenzerheide (east side)	Heimberg	4-man detachable chairlift	1480	Garaventa	2004 (1954)
Lenzerheide (east side)	Weisshorn Speed	6-man detachable chairlift with bubble	2281	Garaventa	1999 (1972)
Lenzerheide (east side)	Motta	6-man detachable chairlift with bubble	989	Garaventa	2013 (1972)
Lenzerheide (east side)	Urdenfürggli	6-man detachable chairlift with bubble	910	Garaventa	2013 (1975)
Lenzerheide (east side)	Obertor	4-man chairlift	583	BMF Bartholet	2015
Lenzerheide (east side)	Scharmoin	T-bar	1218	Habegger	1965
Lenzerheide (east side)	Crappa Grossa	T-bar	440	Doppelmayr	1968
Lenzerheide (east side)	Fastatsch	T-bar	363	Garaventa	1977
Lenzerheide (east side)	Dieschen	T-bar	463	Garaventa	1986 (1964)
Lenzerheide (west side)	Scalottas	3-man detachable chairlift	1584	Garaventa	1986 (1943)
Lenzerheide (west side)	Tgantieni	3-man detachable chairlift	1273	Garaventa	1988 (1942)
Lenzerheide (west side)	Pedra Grossa	4-man detachable chairlift	1528	Garaventa	1990 (1972)
Lenzerheide (west side)	Stätzertäli	4-man detachable chairlift with bubble	1725	Leitner	1995 (1965)
Lenzerheide (west side)	Lavoz	6-man detachable chairlift with bubble	1725	Doppelmayr	1997 (1972)
Lenzerheide (west side)	Stätzerhorn	6-man detachable chairlift with bubble	2278	Doppelmayr	1999 (1960)
Lenzerheide (west side)	Cumascheals	4-man detachable chairlift with bubble	1649	Garaventa	1999 (1972)
Lenzerheide (west side)	Obertor	4-man chairlift	583	BMF Bartholet	2015
Lenzerheide (west side)	Valbella	T-bar	1255	Brändle	1955
Lenzerheide (west side)	Proschieri	T-bar	676	WSO Städeli	1965
Lenzerheide (west side)	Gertrud	T-bar	900	Garaventa	1972
Lenzerheide (west side)	Crestas	T-bar	607	Garaventa	1949
Lenzerheide (west side)	Fadail 1 & 2	T-bar	418	Garaventa	1983/94
Churwalden	Heidbüel	8-man gondola lift	1778	BMF Bartholet	2015 (1962)
Churwalden	Pradaschier	4-man detachable chairlift	1767	Leitner	1999 (1968)
Churwalden	Windegga	T-bar	1474	WSO Städeli	1968
Churwalden	Pradafenz	Button lift	700	WSO Städeli	1973

== Urdenbahn (Hörnli–Urdenfürggli cable car) ==
The centrepiece of the resort compound is the Urdenbahn cable car, built and operated by the Arosa Bergbahnen company.

The Austrian-Swiss cableway manufacturer Steurer Seilbahnen created two parallel single-track twin-cable aerial ropeways which manage with a single rope span without pylons. There are two rope loops, the return of the ropes is in each case on the track of the other path. For stabilizing the ropes 17 large supporting cable tabs are used. Two glazed Kuechler design cabins from Gangloff are installed with six automatic doors and a capacity of 150 people each. The hourly transportation capacity is 1,700 persons per direction. At low ridership or technical restrictions the Urdenbahn can be operated with just one car. The emergency passenger evacuating concept includes the use of winches between the two cabins.

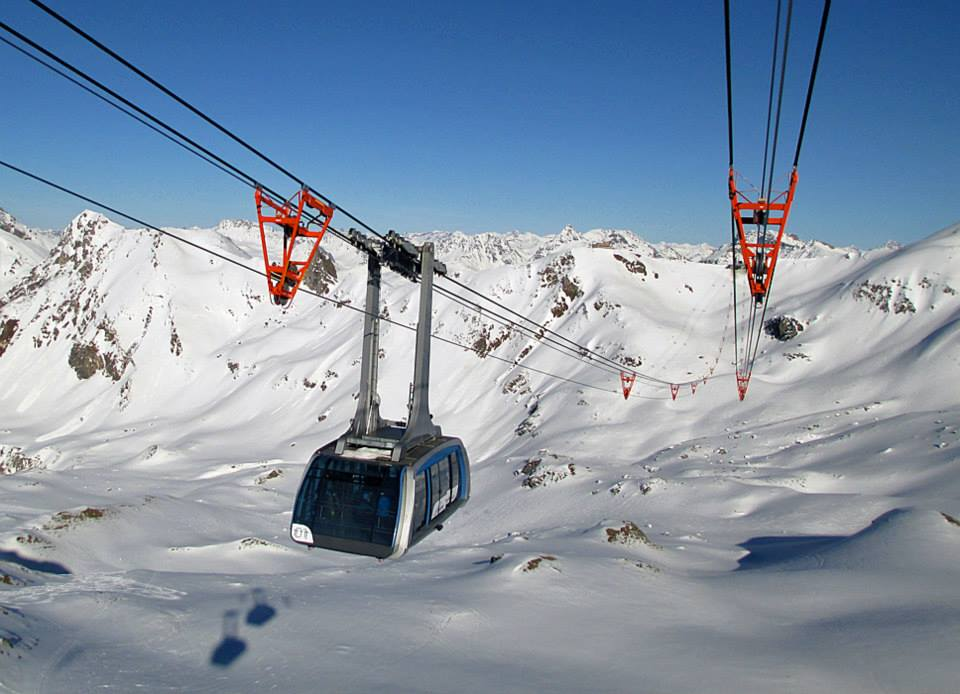
Cable car Urdenbahn connecting the resorts of Arosa and Lenzerheide

=== Technical specifications ===
- Runway length: 1,682 m (5,518 ft)
- East station Arosa: 2,496 m (8,189 ft) asl
- West station Lenzerheide: 2,562 m (8,406 ft) asl
- Altitude difference: 66 m (217 ft)
- Capacity/payload per cabin: 150 + 1 Pers. / 12,080 kg (26,630 lb)
- Dimension suspension ropes: 76 mm (2.99 in)
- Dimension pull ropes: 42 mm (1.65 in)
- Average power: 850 kW (1,140 hp)
- Maximum travelling speed: 12 m/s (39.37 ft/s)
- Average travel time: 5 minutes (incl. waiting time in cabin)
- Installed carrying capacity: 2 × 850 Pers./h

== Ski schools ==
Arosa Lenzerheide has a variety of ski schools. Each has several different classes, based on age and ability.

== Recent investments and notable investment projects ==
In 2016 snowmaking facilities were installed between Parpan and Churwalden as well as between Pradaschier and Churwalden.

In 2017 the mountain restaurant 'Motta' was rebuilt.

In 2019 the chairlift 'Brüggerhorn' was rebuilt.

In 2020 snowmaking facilities were installed along the 'Black Diamond Slope'.

In 2021 the chairlift 'Weisshorn Speed' was equipped with new chairs and new transport facilities for mountain bikes.

In 2024 the chairlift 'Stätzertäli' was rebuilt.

== See also ==
- Swiss Alps
- List of ski areas and resorts in Switzerland
