= Tschuggen =

Mountain in Switzerland

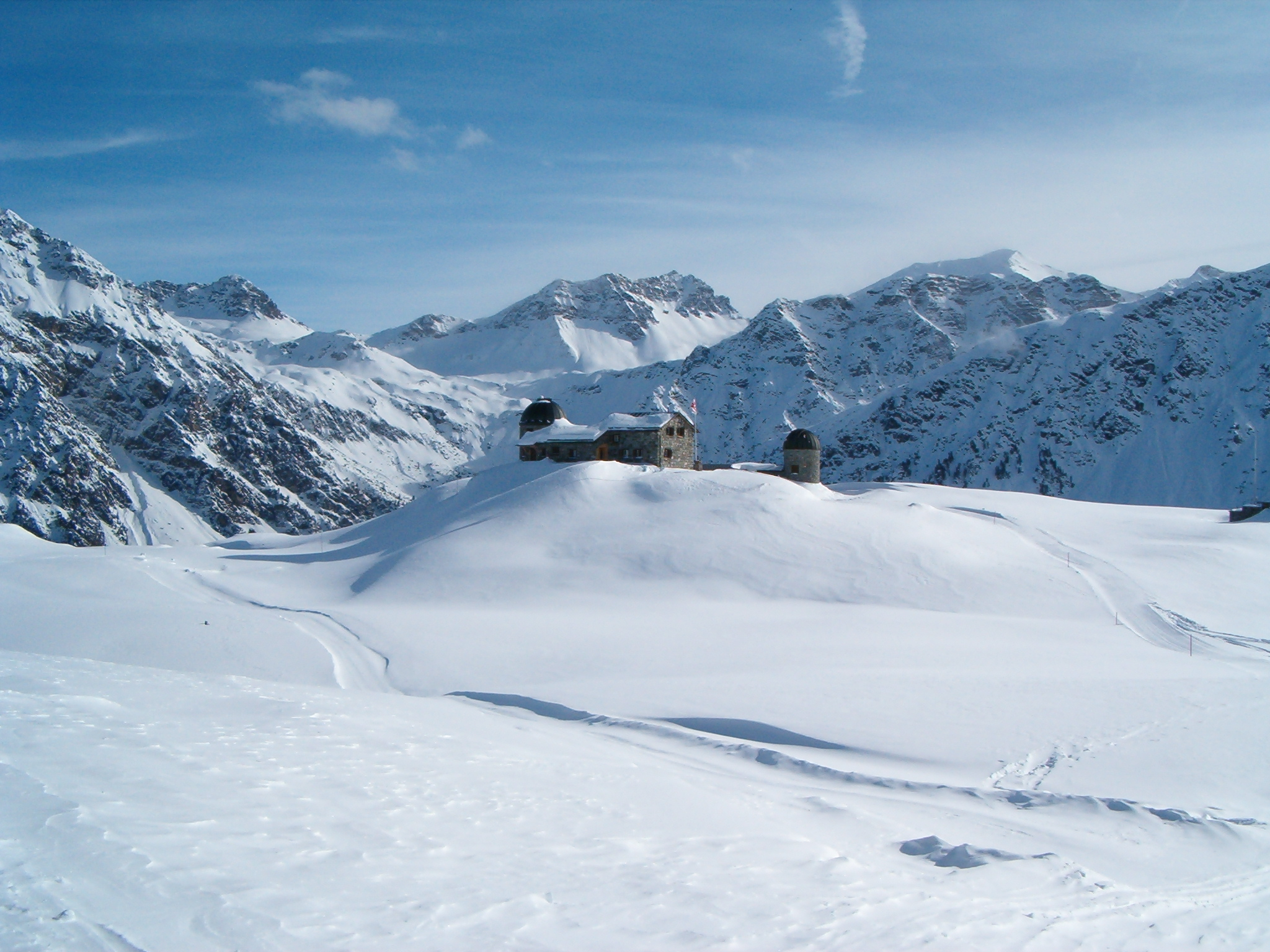
- Tschuggen with ancient astronomical observatory

Highest point
- Elevation: 2,049 m (6,722 ft)
- Prominence: 34 m (112 ft)
- Parent peak: Aroser Weisshorn
- Coordinates: 46°47′0″N 9°39′52″E

Geography
- Location within Switzerland
- Location: Graubünden, Switzerland
- Parent range: Plessur Alps

The Tschuggen is a mountain of the Plessur Alps, overlooking Arosa in the Swiss canton of Graubünden.

A gondola lift and a chairlift link the top of the mountain with the town and resort of Arosa — the base station of the chairlift is near to Arosa railway station.

Near the summit are located an observatory and a mountain hut.
