= Ober =

Ober may refer to:

- Ober (playing card), court card in the German and Swiss styles of playing cards
- Ober, Indiana, an unincorporated community in Washington Township, Starke County
- Oberek (also ober), a lively Polish dance in triple metre
- Waiter (film) (Dutch: Ober), a 2006 absurdist black comedy

== People ==
- Margarethe Arndt-Ober (1885–1971), German opera singer
- Bailey Ober (born 1995), American professional baseball pitcher
- Caroline Haven Ober (1866–1929), regent and vice-directress of the Normal School in Argentina
- Christopher Ober (born 1954), American/Canadian materials scientist and engineer
- Eric Ober, American broadcasting executive
- Frederick A. Ober (1849–1913), American naturalist and writer
- Harold Ober (1881–1959), American literary agent
- Henry Kulp Ober (1878–1939), American college president and bishop
- Josiah Ober, American historian of ancient Greece and classical political theorist
- Ken Ober (1957–2009), American game show host, comedian, and actor
- Philip Ober (1902–1982), American screen and stage actor
- Robert Ober (1881–1950), American stage and silent-screen actor

== See also ==
- Obersee (disambiguation)
- Oberst (disambiguation)
