= Oberst (disambiguation) =

Oberst is a military rank corresponding to Colonel OF-5 in Anglophone countries, or Polkovnik in Slavophone armed forces.

Oberst may also refer to:

== People ==
- Oberst (surname), a surname of Germanic origin
- Bill Oberst Jr. (born 1965), American stage, film and television actor
- Conor Oberst (born 1980), American singer-songwriter
- Emily Oberst (born 1998), American wheelchair basketball player
- Eugene Oberst (1901–1991), American athlete
- Jack Oberst (1918–2009), American professional basketball player
- Maximilian Oberst (1849–1925), German physician and surgeon
- Robert Oberst (born 1984), American strongman

== Places ==
- Oberst, locality in the city of Wuppertal, North Rhine-Westphalia, Germany
- Oberst Glacier, a glacier in the Sor Rondane Mountains, Antarctica

== See also ==
- Ober (disambiguation)
