= Parpan =

- Former municipality
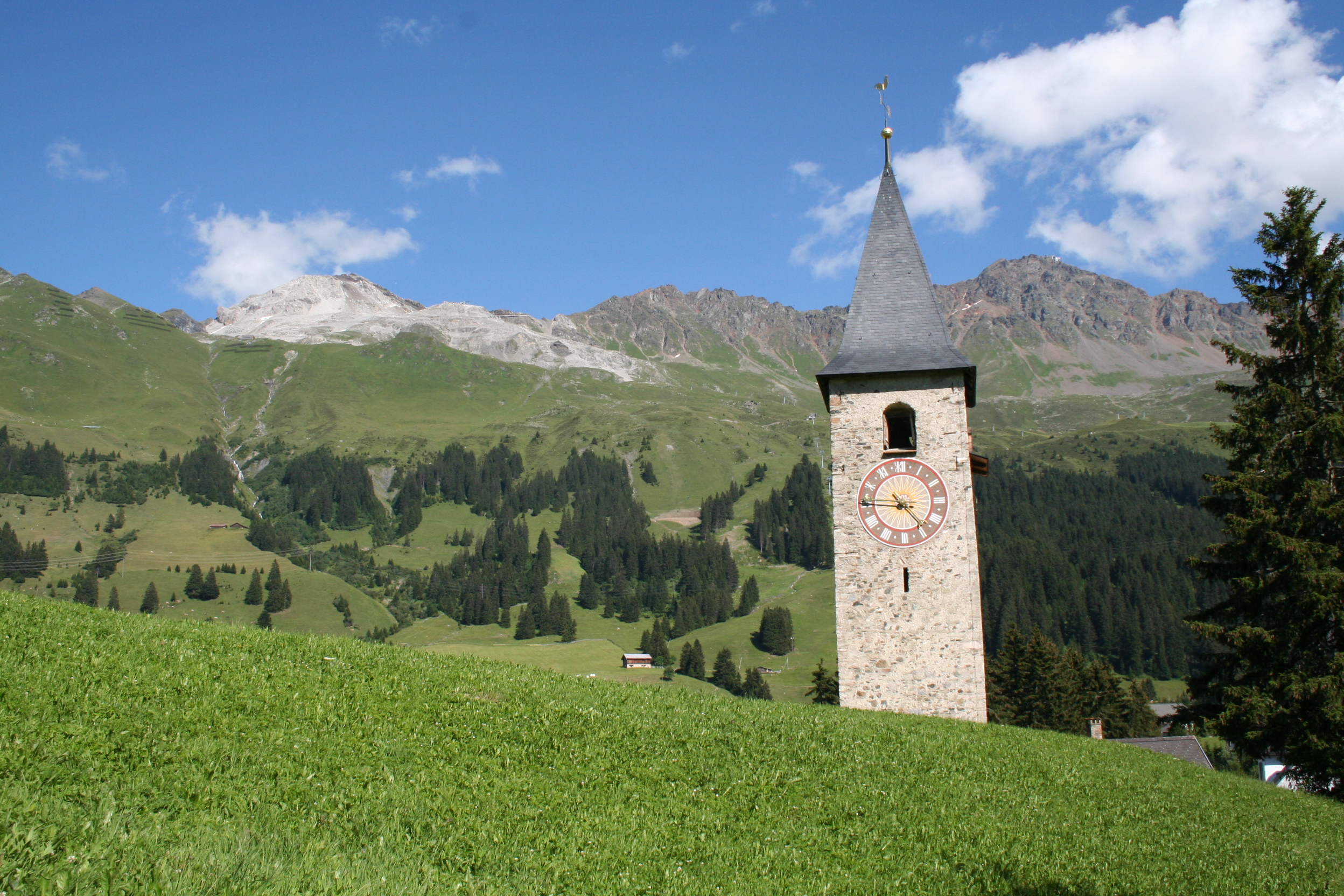

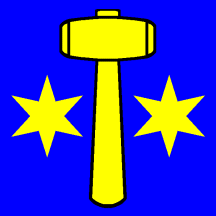
- Flag Coat of arms
- Location of Parpan
- Location within Switzerland Location within Canton of Graubünden
- Coordinates: 46°47′N 9°33′E
- Country: Switzerland
- Canton: Graubünden
- District: Plessur

Area
  - Total: 9.30 km^{2} (3.59 sq mi)
- Elevation: 1,493 m (4,898 ft)

Population (December 2008)
  - Total: 245
  - Density: 26.3/km^{2} (68.2/sq mi)
- Time zone: UTC+01:00 (CET)
  - Summer (DST): UTC+02:00 (CEST)
- Postal code: 7076
- SFOS number: 3913
- ISO 3166 code: CH-GR
- Surrounded by: Churwalden, Tschiertschen, Vaz/Obervaz
- Website: www.parpan.ch

Parpan was a municipality in the district Plessur of the canton of Graubünden in Switzerland. On 1 January 2010 the municipalities of Malix and Parpan merged into Churwalden.

== History ==
Parpan is first mentioned in 1208 as Partipan. Formerly in Romansh it was known as Parpaun.

== Origin of the name ==
Parpan is a common surname in Graubünden. Etymologically "Parpan" originates from the French partis-pain, meaning "bread-deliverer".

== Geography ==
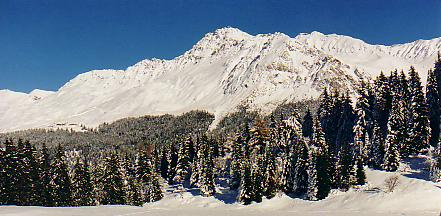
Rothorn mountain above Parpan

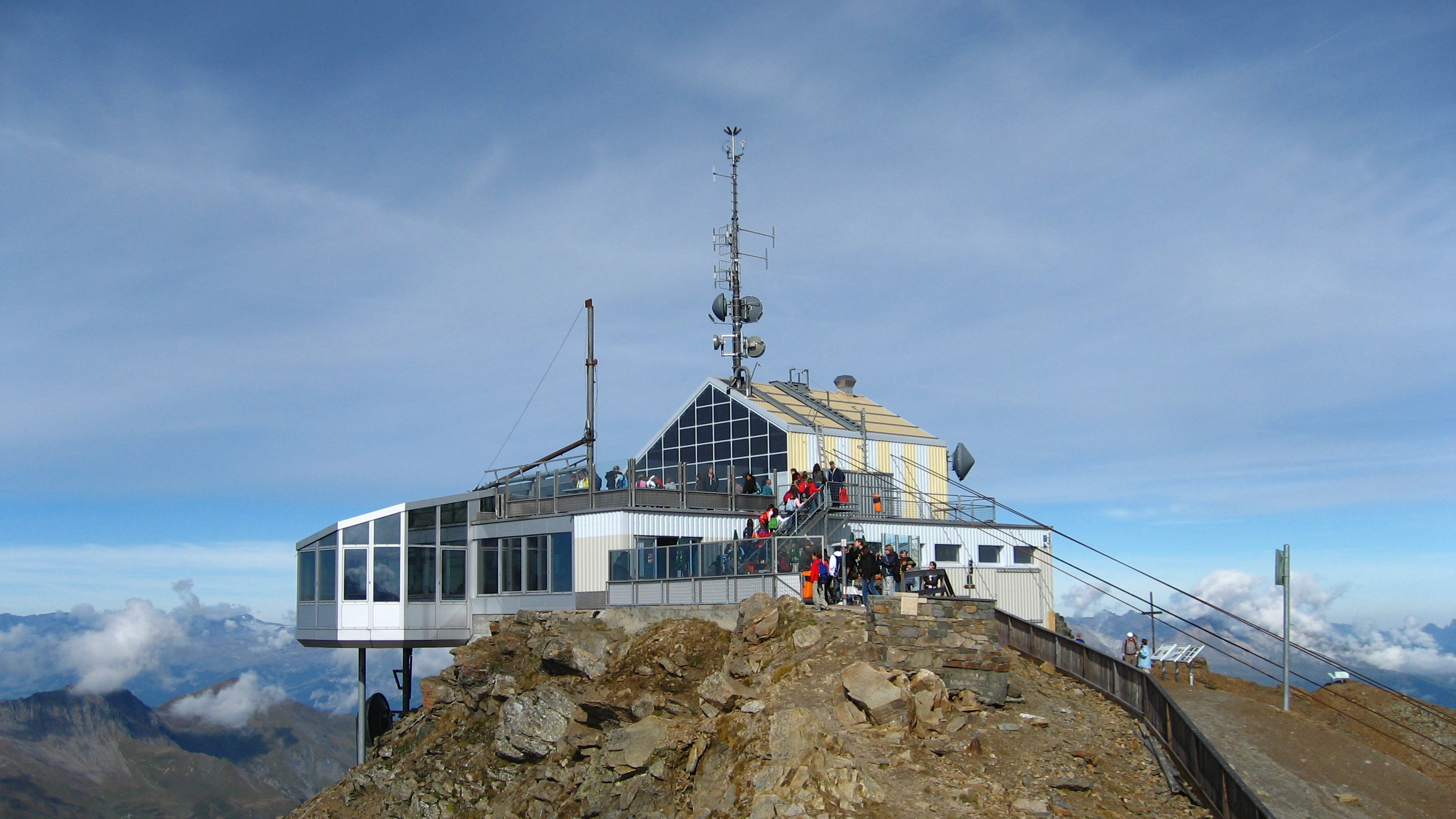
Peak station on the Rothorn above Parpan

Aerial view from 1500 m by Walter Mittelholzer (1927)

Parpan has an area, as of 2006, of 9.3 km^{2} (3.6 sq mi). Of this area, 64.9% is used for agricultural purposes, while 22.8% is forested. Of the rest of the land, 3.1% is settled (buildings or roads) and the remainder (9.1%) is non-productive (rivers, glaciers or mountains).

The municipality is located in the Churwalden sub-district of the Plessur district in the Churwalden valley. The village lies in the valley between the cantonal capital Chur and the resort Lenzerheide. It offers access to the skiing area of Rothorn and mountain railways Danis Staetz AG. The finish of the Alpine skiing World Cup slope "Silvano Beltrametti" for the downhill race in Lenzerheide is in Parpan.

At the end of 2013 the ski resort was linked with Arosa by cable-car, creating the new ski resort of Arosa Lenzerheide. Since then transport passes work in both resorts.

Parpan municipality consists of the Haufendorf village (an irregular, unplanned and quite closely packed village, built around a central square) of Parpan. The municipalities of Malix and Parpan merged on 1 January 2010 into the municipality of Churwalden.

== Demographics ==
Parpan has a population (as of 2008) of 245, of which 7.3% are foreign nationals. Over the last 10 years the population has decreased at a rate of -15%. Most of the population (as of 2000) speaks German (96.6%), with Romansh being second most common ( 0.8%) and Dutch being third ( 0.8%).

As of 2000, the gender distribution of the population was 50.6% male and 49.4% female. The age distribution, as of 2000, in Parpan is; 33 children or 12.5% of the population are between 0 and 9 years old. 19 teenagers or 7.2% are 10 to 14, and 19 teenagers or 7.2% are 15 to 19. Of the adult population, 22 people or 8.4% of the population are between 20 and 29 years old. 51 people or 19.4% are 30 to 39, 41 people or 15.6% are 40 to 49, and 27 people or 10.3% are 50 to 59. The senior population distribution is 24 people or 9.1% of the population are between 60 and 69 years old, 20 people or 7.6% are 70 to 79, there are 7 people or 2.7% who are 80 to 89.

In the 2007 federal election the most popular party was the SVP which received 34.9% of the vote. The next three most popular parties were the FDP (32.2%), the SP (19%) and the CVP (13.4%).

The entire Swiss population is generally well educated. In Parpan about 84.2% of the population (between age 25-64) have completed either non-mandatory upper secondary education or additional higher education (either University or a Fachhochschule).

Parpan has an unemployment rate of 0.12%. As of 2005, there were 13 people employed in the primary economic sector and about 5 businesses involved in this sector. people are employed in the secondary sector and there are businesses in this sector. 58 people are employed in the tertiary sector, with 16 businesses in this sector.

The historical population is given in the following table:

year	population
1623	c. 220
1850	92
1900	62
1950	89
1960	99
1970	118
1980	129
1990	175
2000	263

== Heritage sites of national significance ==
The Schlössli or little castle is listed as a Swiss heritage site of national significance.
