= Untersee =

Untersee (English: lower lake) may refer to:

== Lakes or lake sections ==
- Lake Untersee, Antarctica
- Untersee (Lake Constance), the smaller, lower section of Lake Constance
- The lower, larger part of Lake Zurich is sometimes called unterer Zürichsee or Untersee

== People ==
- Franz Joseph Untersee, a Swiss-American architect
- Joel Untersee, a Swiss football player

== See also ==
- Obersee (disambiguation)
- Unterseen, a town in the canton of Bern, Switzerland
- Unterseeboot (U-Boot), anglicized to U-boat
