= Maximilian Oberst =

German physician and surgeon

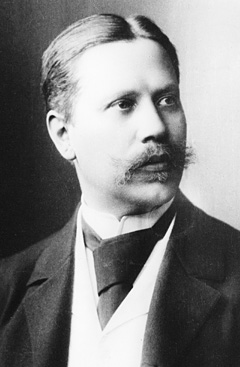
Maximilian Oberst

Maximilian Oberst (October 6, 1849 – November 18, 1925) was a German physician and surgeon born in Regensburg.

He studied medicine at the Ludwig-Maximilians-Universität München, and from 1874 to 1877 was an assistant in the surgical department at a hospital in Augsburg. From 1877, he worked as an assistant to Richard von Volkmann at the University of Halle, obtaining his habilitation in 1881. In 1884, became an assistant professor at the University of Halle, and from 1894 to 1920 was director and chief physician at the Krankenhaus Bergmannstrost in Halle. In 1919, he attained the title of professor ordinarius (full professor).

He is credited for introducing a method of block anesthesia ("Oberst-block") for use in minor surgery of the finger. In 1882 he published Die Amputationen unter dem Einflusse der antiseptischen Behandlung ("Amputations under the influence of antiseptic treatment").
