= Oberst (surname) =

Surname

Oberst is a surname of Germanic origin, having originated as a topographic name for someone who lived in the highest part of a village or on a hillside, from Middle High German obrist, meaning ‘uppermost’ (later oberst), the superlative form of ober.

== See also ==
- Oberst (disambiguation)
