= Obersee =

Obersee (German, 'Upper Lake') may refer to:

- Lake Ober-See, a meltwater lake in the Gruber Mountains, Antarctica
- Obersee (Arosa), a lake in the resort town of Arosa, Grisons, Switzerland
- Obersee (Glarus), a mountain lake in the canton of Glarus, Switzerland
- Obersee (Königssee), a mountain lake in southeastern Bavaria
- Obersee (Lake Constance), the larger of the two parts of Lake Constance
- Obersee (Lake Zurich), a section of Lake Zurich, Switzerland
- Obersee (Rur), a reservoir in the Eifel mountains, Germany
- Obersee Nachrichten, a former newspaper published in the area of Obersee (Lake Zurich)
- Obersee, a previous name for the Egerner cove of the Tegernsee (lake) in Bavaria
- Obersee, an informal name for the upper part of the Weitsee lake in Bavaria

== See also ==
- Oberaarsee
- Oberseen
- Übersee
- Untersee (disambiguation)
