= Gunther O. Hofmann =

German surgeon, biophysicist, and professor

Gunther Olaf Hofmann
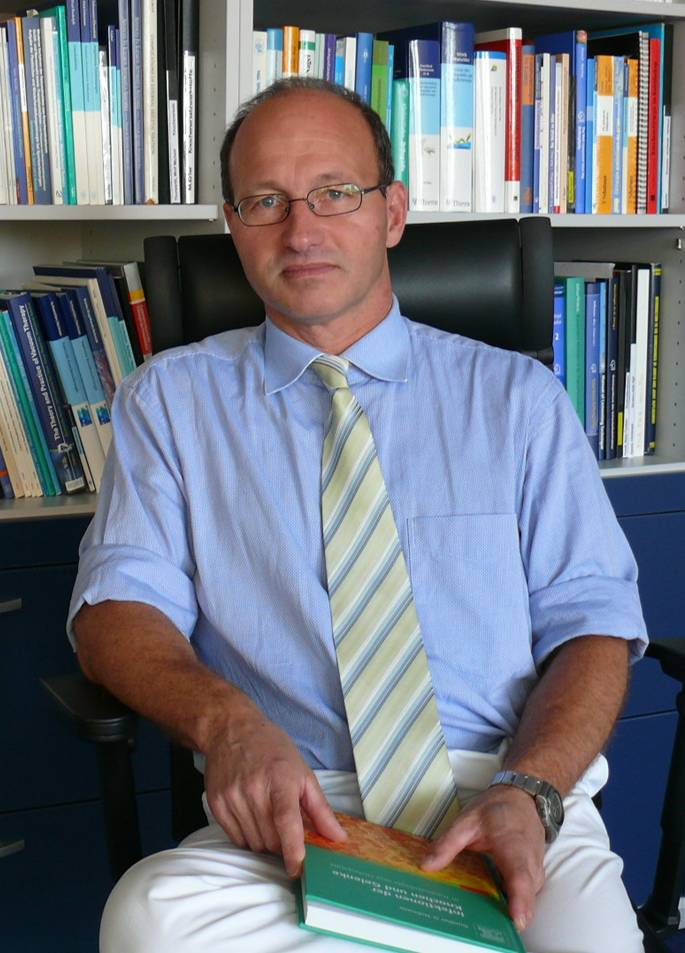
- Gunther O. Hofmann, 2009
- Born: 22 May 1957 (age 69); Landshut Bavaria Germany
- Education: LMU Munich, Technical University of Munich
- Known for: First transplantation of a human knee joint
- Scientific career
- Fields: medicine, physics
- Workplaces: Berufsgenossenschaftliche Kliniken Bergmannstrost Halle (Saale); Hospital of the Friedrich-Schiller-Universität Jena; Friedrich-Schiller-Universität Jena

Gunther O. Hofmann (born 22 May 1957 in Landshut, Bavaria) is a German surgeon, biophysicist, and professor.

== Early life and education ==
Gunther O. Hofmann was born in 1957 in Landshut, Bavaria.

Hofmann attended medical school and earned a Staatsexamen and a doctorate (Dr. med.) from LMU Munich. Thereafter, he moved to the Technical University of Munich, where he graduated in 1984 with a Dr. rer. nat. (Doctor rerum naturalium) in physics.

== Career ==
In 1987, Hofmann commenced work as a research fellow at the LMU Klinikum until he started his Habilitation in 1992. During his habilitation, Hofmann did research at the Massachusetts General Hospital in Boston, Massachusetts, and started to work at LMU Klinikum (hospital of LMU Munich) in the same year.

In 1995, he moved to the Berufsgenossenschaftliche Unfallklinik (BG Trauma Hospital) Murnau.

Since 2004, Hofmann has been the medical director of Berufsgenossenschaftliche Kliniken Bergmannstrost Halle, Saxony-Anhalt and Director of Hospital for Trauma, Hand, and Reconstructive Surgery at the Friedrich Schiller University of Jena, Thuringia.

=== Research interests ===
His major research fields are Development of implants for osteosynthesis and joint replacement, bone and joint grafting, biomaterials, biomechanics, computer-assisted surgery, infections of bones

- Example (2010): Development of a prosthetic hand with microsensors

== Selected works ==
- 1988 Quantitative Elektromyographie in der Biomechanik (Quantitative electromyography in biomechanics) in: Physik in unserer Zeit (Physics in our time) Volume 19, Issue 5, pages 132–136,
- 1997 Biologisch abbaubare Knochenimplantate (Biodegradable bone implants) in: Spektrum der Wissenschaft 2/1997
- 2001 Clinical experience in allogeneic vascularized bone and joint allografting in: Microsurgery Volume 20 Issue 8 p. 375–383, 2000 Microsurgery Special Issue: Proceedings of the Second International Symposium on Composite Tissue Allotransplantation, Louisville, Kentucky
- 2003 Therapeutische Optionen bei persistierendem Kniegelenkinfekt in: Trauma und Berufskrankheit Volume 5, Supplement 2, p. 221-224 Springer-Verlag Heidelberg
- 2004 Infektionen der Knochen und Gelenke (Infections of bones and joints) in: Traumatologie und Orthopädie, Verlag Urban & Fischer München/Jena
- 2005 Modular Uncemented Tricompartmental Total Knee Arthroplasty in: European Journal of Trauma and Emergency Surgery, 2005/2
- 2006 Knochen- und Gelenktransplantation (Bone and joint transplantation) in: Transplantationsmedizin. Ein Leitfaden für den Praktiker p. 241-252 Walter de Gruyter Verlag Berlin
- 2009 Radiation- and reference base-free navigation procedure for placement of instruments and implants: Application to retrograde drilling of osteochondral lesions of the knee joint in: Computer Aided Surgery 2009 Volume 14 No. 4-6 p. 109-116 (Hofmann a.o.)

== Awards ==
- 1986 Otto-Götze-Award of the Association of Bavarian Surgeons (in German: Vereinigung der Bayerischen Chirurgen)
- 1997 Herbert-Stiller-Award of the Physicians Against Animal Experiments (in German: Ärzte gegen Tierversuche)
- 2008: Science4Life Venture Cup for the development of an optical system for detection of osteoarthritis (Team arthrospec AG)
