= Berufsgenossenschaftliche Kliniken Bergmannstrost Halle =

- Verein für berufsgenossenschaftliche Heilbehandlung Halle e. V.

Geography
- Location: Halle, Saxony-Anhalt, Germany
- Coordinates: 51°27′37″N 11°59′03″E

Organisation
- Type: Teaching; Specialist
- Affiliated university: University of Halle-Wittenberg
- Patron: Prof. Dr. Dr. Hofmann

Services
- Emergency department: I
- Beds: 452

Helipads
- Helipad: Yes

History
- Founded: 1894

Links
- Website: http://www.bergmannstrost.com/
- Other links: List of university hospitals

The Berufsgenossenschaftliche Kliniken Bergmannstrost Halle is the teaching hospital facility of University of Halle-Wittenberg, located in Halle, Saxony-Anhalt (Germany).

== History ==
In the end of the 19th Century Mining Consultant Bernhard Leopold initiated the construction of the hospital Bergmannstrost for the protection of the health care at accident and disease of miners of these region.

== Priorities ==
=== Trauma center ===
Polytraumamanagement means the inter-departmental cooperation for senior professionals. Through the CT scanner in one of the shock rooms in Bergmannstrost can be integrated diagnostic and therapeutic life-saving activities simultaneously. Because in the initial treatment of multiple trauma every minute counts, can even choose between life and death, will thus gain precious time and reduced the mortality significantly.

=== Burn center ===
The extensive thermal trauma is one of the worst possible injury. The deep, extensive destruction of the body surface area results not only to local damage in unity with the Collapse of the skin as the anatomical barrier, but rather by the activation or excessive reaction of the cellular and humoral cascade systems (immune response) to life-threatening physical reactions (Systemic inflammatory response syndrome)
The Burn center in Halle offers as one of three Burn centers in Eastern Germany all services for the treatment of severely burned (first aid, including intensive care and reconstruction of the injured skin areas, rehabilitation).

=== Centre for Spinal Cord Injuries ===
Here patients are treated with diseases or abnormalities of the spine and impending or occurring Paraplegia.

=== Interdisciplinary early rehabilitation ===
The aim is quickly reintegrate patients of the Bergmannstrost into the working and social life. The treatment begins before the surgery or as soon thereafter as possible at the bedside.

== Departments ==
Clinics / Specialist areas / Centres / Departments	beds	Leaders
Clinic of Trauma and Reconstructive Surgery	108	Prof. Dr. Dr. Hofmann
Centre for Spinal Cord Injuries and Clinic for Orthopaedics	60	Dr. med. Klaus Röhl
Clinic of Plastic and Hand Surgery, Burn center	36 + 8	PD Dr. med. Steen
Clinic of general and visceral surgery	36	Dr. med. Zaage
Clinic of Neurosurgery	36	Prof. Dr. med. Meisel
Clinic of Neurology	36	PD Dr. med. Wohlfahrt
Clinic of Interdisciplinary Early Rehabilitation	40	PD Dr. med. Wohlfahrt
Clinic of imaging diagnostics and interventional radiology	-	Dr. med. Braunschweig
Department of anesthesiology, intensive care and emergency medicine	20	PD Dr. med. Stuttmann
Medical Clinic	72	PD Dr. med. Barth
Department of medical psychology ^{1}	-	Dr. Utz Ullmann
Social service	-	
Pastoral care	-	
Policlinic	ambulant	Dr. jur. Hubert Erhard

^{1} Help in coping with the new situation, Therapies for the adoption of a changed body image and psychological Pain Management, Therapy of reactive depression or Posttraumatic stress disorder are in the focus of the Department of Medical Psychology in cooperation with the other Department and Clinics, but also the monitoring of family, consulting Supervision and demand crisis intervention of the medical treatment teams. .
