= 1304 Arosa =

Main-belt asteroid

Discovery
- Discovered by: K. Reinmuth
- Discovery site: Heidelberg Obs.
- Discovery date: 21 May 1928

Designations
- Named after: Arosa (Swiss village)
- Alternative designations: 1928 KC · 1929 RY; 1934 JL · 1934 LE; 1974 OW · A908 YC
- Minor planet category: main-belt · (outer) background

Orbital characteristics
- Epoch 4 September 2017 (JD 2458000.5)
- Uncertainty parameter 0
- Observation arc: 108.22 yr (39,526 days)
- Aphelion: 3.5731 AU
- Perihelion: 2.8226 AU
- Semi-major axis: 3.1978 AU
- Eccentricity: 0.1173
- Orbital period (sidereal): 5.72 yr (2,089 days)
- Mean anomaly: 207.15°
- Mean motion: 0° 10^{m} 20.64^{s} / day
- Inclination: 18.991°
- Longitude of ascending node: 86.580°
- Argument of perihelion: 148.26°

Physical characteristics
- Dimensions: 31.47±3.06 km 41.67 km (derived); 42.94±1.9 km 43.613±0.241 km 48.35±0.81 km 57.443±1.462 km
- Synodic rotation period: 7.74 h 7.7478±0.0001 h 7.77±0.04 h
- Geometric albedo: 0.1961±0.0279; 0.2125 (derived); 0.279±0.011; 0.337±0.031; 0.3480±0.033; 0.409±0.084
- Spectral type: SMASS = X · M
- Absolute magnitude (H): 8.6 · 9.03±0.27 · 9.10 · 9.2

1304 Arosa, provisional designation 1928 KC, is a metallic asteroid from the outer region of the asteroid belt, approximately 40 kilometers in diameter. It was discovered on 21 May 1928, by German astronomer Karl Reinmuth at Heidelberg Observatory in southwest Germany. It was named after the Swiss mountain village of Arosa.

== Orbit and classification ==
Arosa is a non-family asteroid from the main belt's background population. It orbits the Sun in the outer asteroid belt at a distance of 2.8–3.6 AU once every 5 years and 9 months (2,089 days; semi-major axis of 3.20 AU). Its orbit has an eccentricity of 0.12 and an inclination of 19° with respect to the ecliptic. It was first identified as A908 YC at the discovering observatory in 1908, extending the body's observation arc by 20 years prior to its official discovery.

== Physical characteristics ==
In the SMASS taxonomy, Arosa is classified as a generic X-type asteroid. The Wide-field Infrared Survey Explorer (WISE) groups it into the metallic M-type asteroid subcategory.

=== Rotation period ===
Several rotational lightcurves were obtained from photometric observations between 2002 and 2006. Lightcurve analysis gave a well-defined rotation period of 7.74 hours with a brightness amplitude between 0.32 and 0.38 magnitude (U=3/3/3/2).

=== Diameter and albedo ===
According to the surveys carried out by the Infrared Astronomical Satellite IRAS, the Japanese Akari satellite, and NASA's WISE space telescope with its NEOWISE mission, Arosa measures between 31.47 and 57.443 kilometers in diameter, and its surface has an albedo between 0.1961 and 0.409. The Collaborative Asteroid Lightcurve Link derives an albedo of 0.2125 and a diameter of 41.67 kilometers, using an absolute magnitude of 9.2.

== Naming ==
This minor planet was named for the Swiss mountain village of Arosa, a summer and a winter tourist resort in the Swiss Alps. The official naming citation was also mentioned in The Names of the Minor Planets by Paul Herget in 1955 (H 119).
