= Obersee (Arosa) =

Lake in the canton of Graubünden, Switzerland

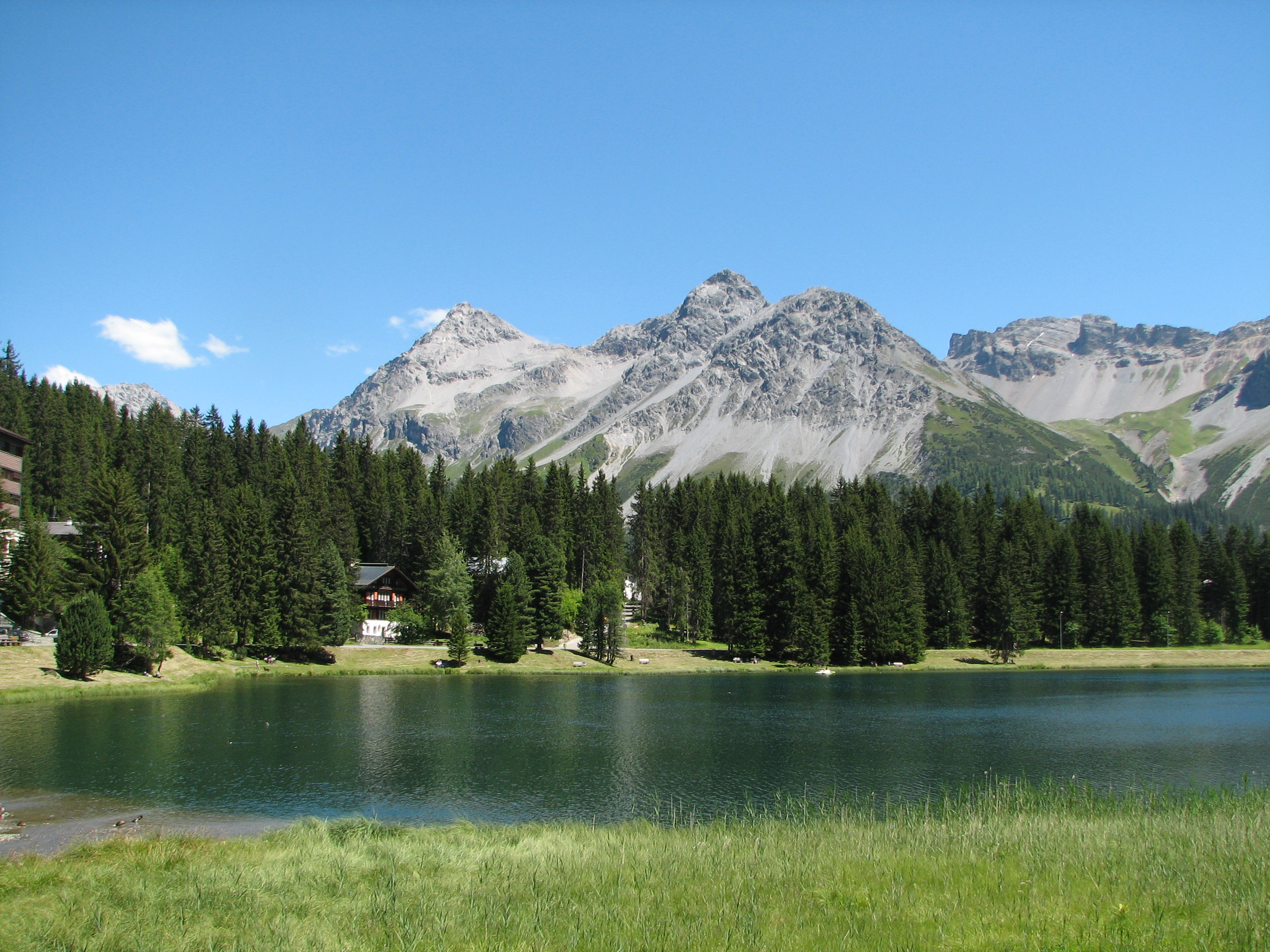

- Location within Canton of Graubünden Location within Switzerland Location within Italy Location within Alps
- Interactive map of Obersee
- Location: Arosa, Grisons
- Coordinates: 46°47′04″N 9°40′53″E
- Type: oligotrophic, dimictic
- Basin countries: Switzerland
- Max. length: 390 m (1,280 ft)
- Max. width: 250 m (820 ft)
- Surface area: 7.1 ha (18 acres)
- Average depth: 7.3 m (24 ft)
- Max. depth: 13 m (43 ft)
- Water volume: 0.5 million cubic metres (410 acre⋅ft)
- Surface elevation: 1,734 m (5,689 ft)
- Frozen: 5-6 months

Obersee (German pronunciation: [ˈoːbɐzeː], lit. 'Upper Lake') or Oberer Arosasee is the lake in the center of Arosa, a resort in the Grisons, Switzerland. The lake has a surface area of 7.1 ha (18 acres) at an elevation of 1734 m. Arosa's lower lake (Untersee) is at 1691 m.

== Gallery ==
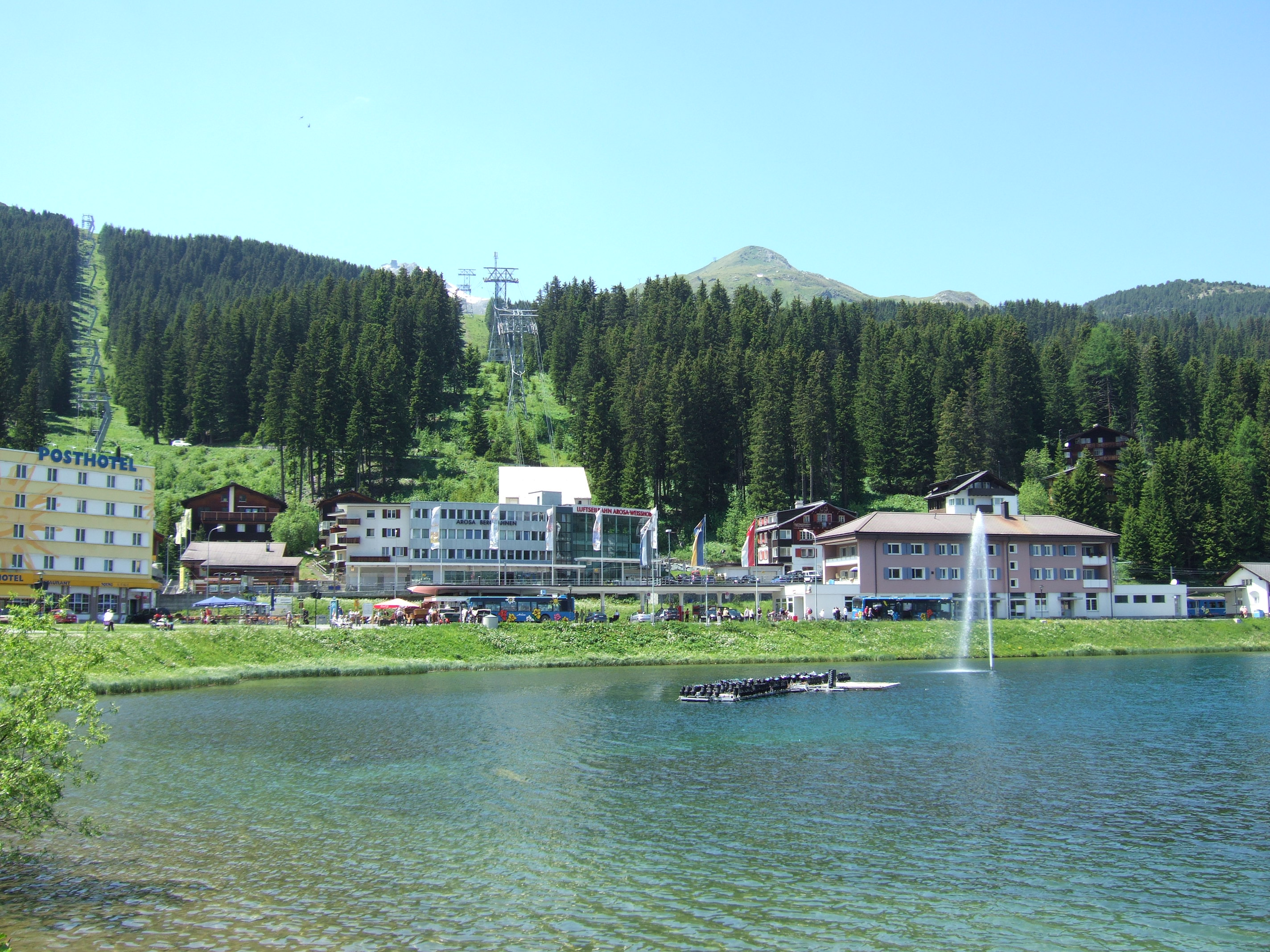
The railway station and cable car by the Obersee

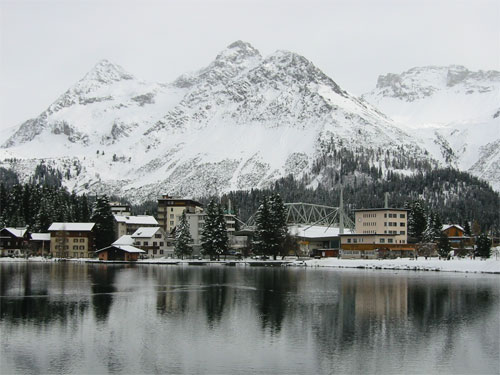
Obersee (November 2002)

== See also ==
- List of mountain lakes of Switzerland
