= Aroser Weisshorn =

Mountain in the Plessur Alps, Switzerland

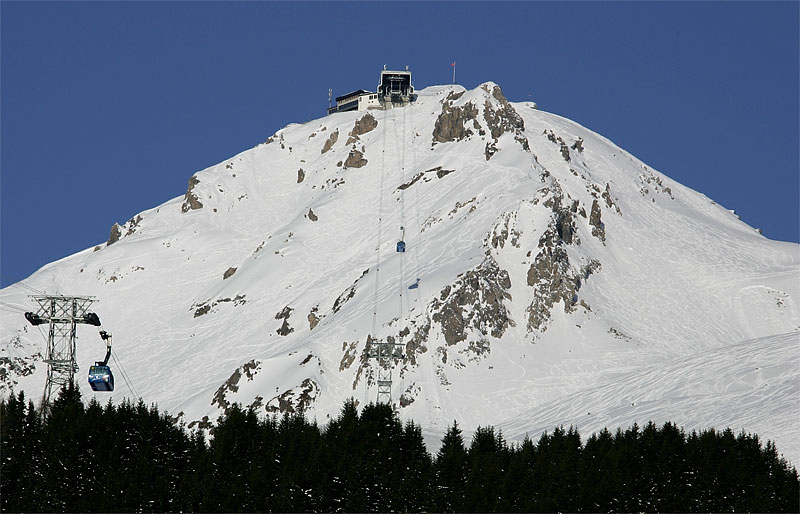

Highest point
- Elevation: 2,653 m (8,704 ft)
- Prominence: 286 m (938 ft)
- Parent peak: Aroser Rothorn
- Coordinates: 46°47′22.5″N 09°38′17.6″E

Geography
- Location within Switzerland
- Location: Graubünden, Switzerland
- Parent range: Plessur Alps

Climbing
- Easiest route: Aerial tramway from Arosa

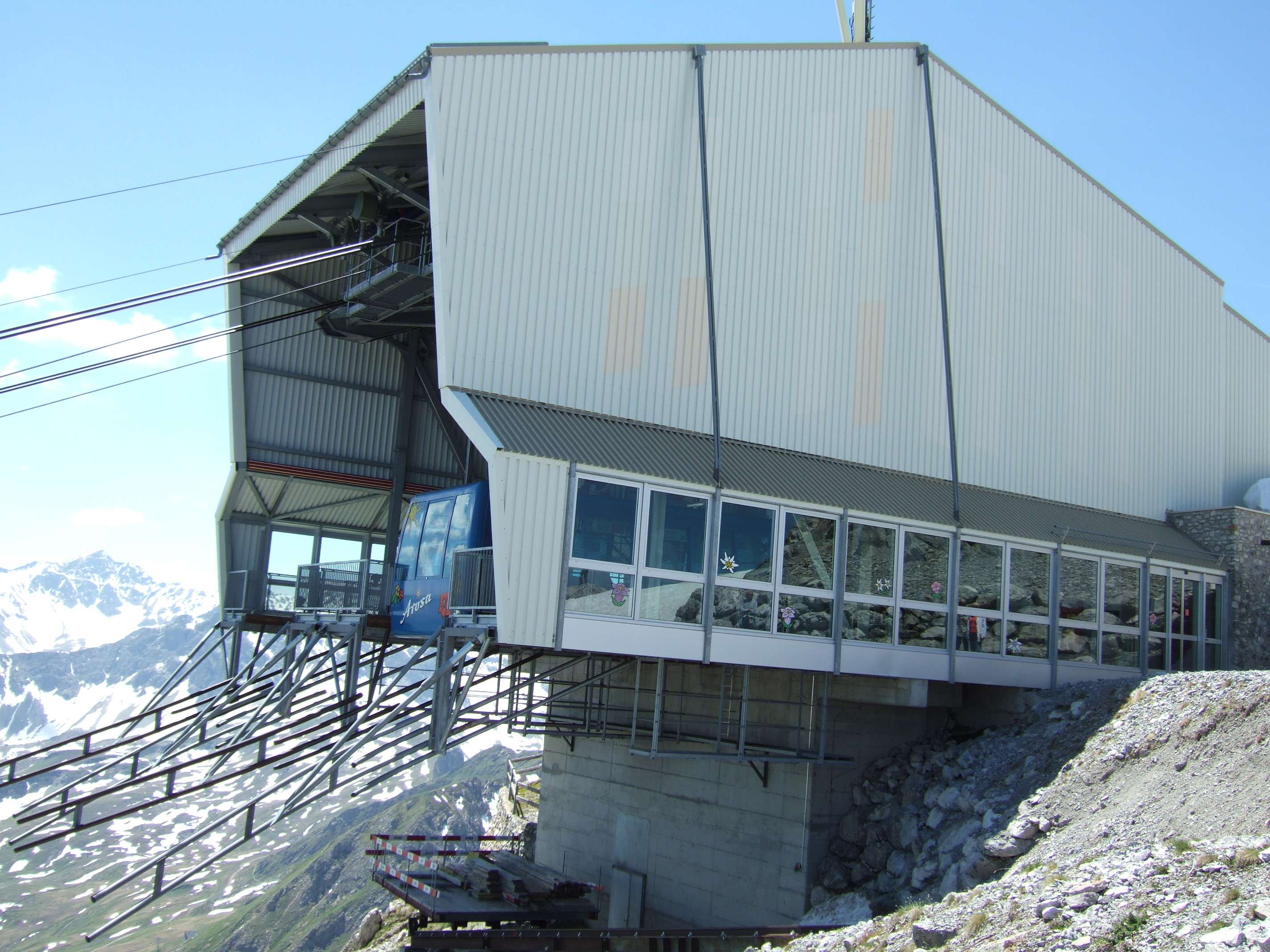
The top station of the cable car, near the summit

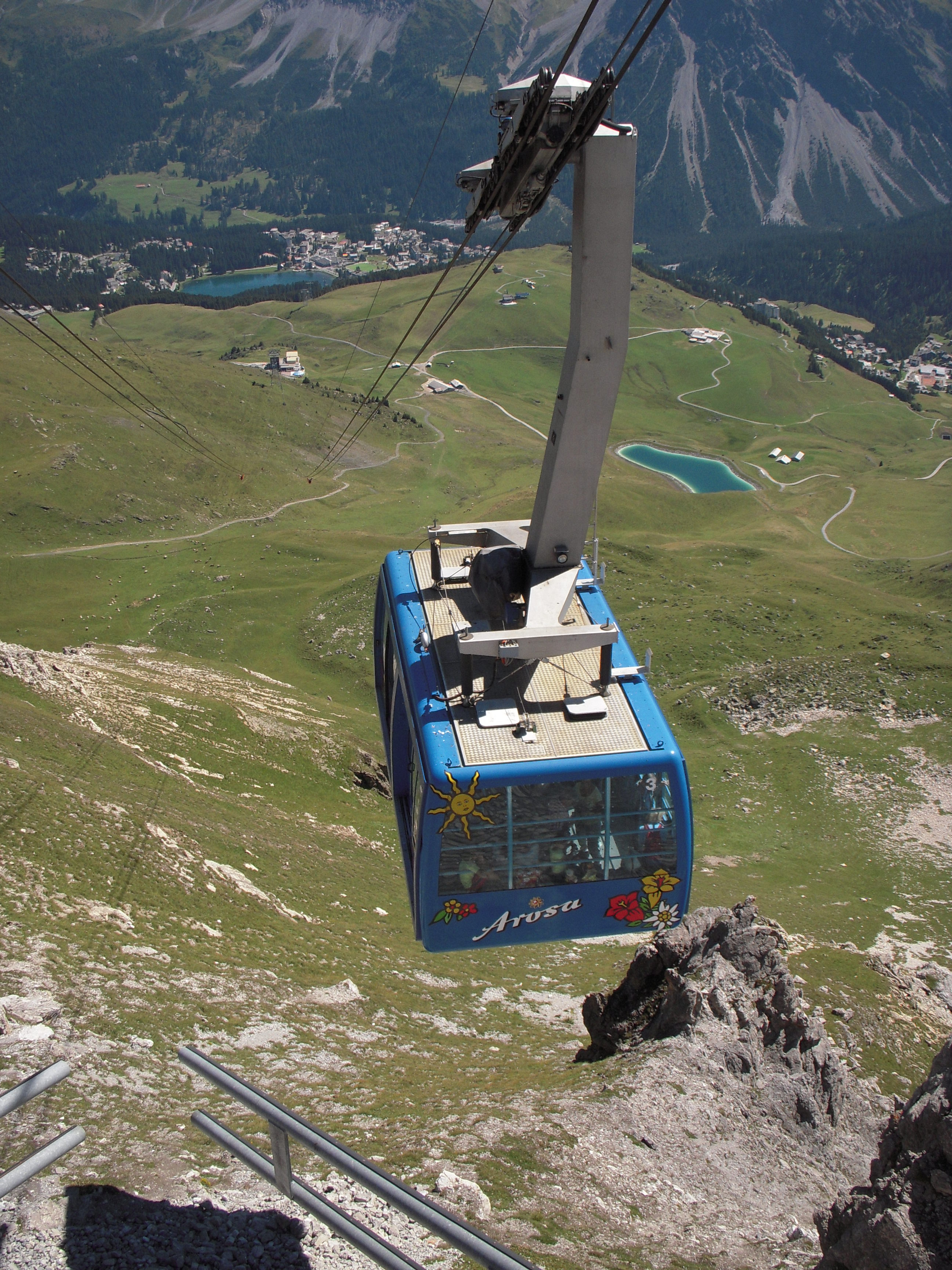
Arosa seen from the top station

The Aroser Weisshorn is a mountain of the Plessur Alps, overlooking Arosa in the canton of Graubünden.

A two-stage cable car links the top of the mountain with the town and resort of Arosa — the base station is near to Arosa railway station.

== See also ==
- List of mountains of Switzerland accessible by public transport
