= Arosa railway station =

Railway station in Switzerland

Arosa
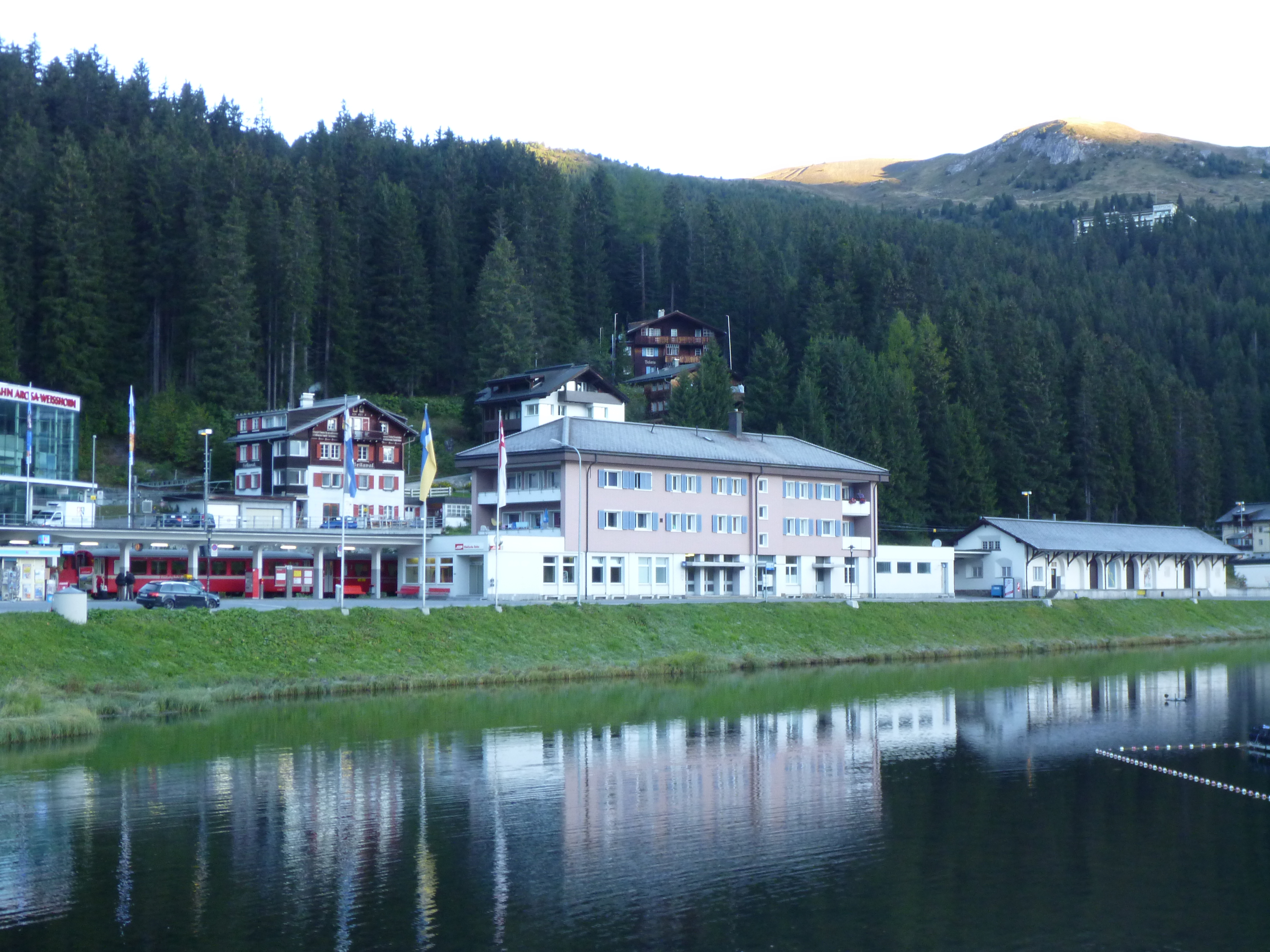
- The station building in 2009

General information
- Location: Tomelistrasse; Arosa; Switzerland
- Coordinates: 46°47′00″N 9°40′46″E
- Elevation: 1,739 m (5,705 ft)
- Owner: Rhaetian Railway (since 1942); Chur-Arosa-Bahn (1914-1942)
- Line: Chur–Arosa line
- Distance: 25.681 kilometres (15.957 mi) from Chur
- Platforms: 2
- Train operators: Rhaetian Railway
- Connections: Cable car to Weisshorn; Local buses

History
- Opened: 12 December 1914

Services
Preceding station	Rhaetian Railway	Following station
Litzirüti towards Chur	RE 6	Terminus
Litzirüti towards Chur	R 16	Terminus
Location

Arosa railway station is a railway station on the Chur–Arosa railway (the "Arosabahn") of the Rhaetian Railway (RhB). It is situated in the town and resort of Arosa, close by to the Obersee (one of the lakes in the vicinity).

The station is the upper terminus of the line and has a number of passenger facilities including a ticket office, shop, and cafe.

A 299m long tunnel takes the line under part of Arosa as it ascends to the station. There is a large yard of freight/rolling stock sidings just beyond the station at the very end of the line, as well as a 2-road locomotive shed (essentially for shunters) at the lower end.

== Weisshorn cable car ==
The base station of the cable car up the Aroser Weisshorn is situated very near to the station. Cable cars arrive/depart every 20 minutes during daytime for much of the year.

== Services ==
As of the December 2023 timetable change, the following services stop at Arosa:

- RegioExpress: four round-trips per day to Chur.
- Regio: hourly service to Chur.

== Gallery ==
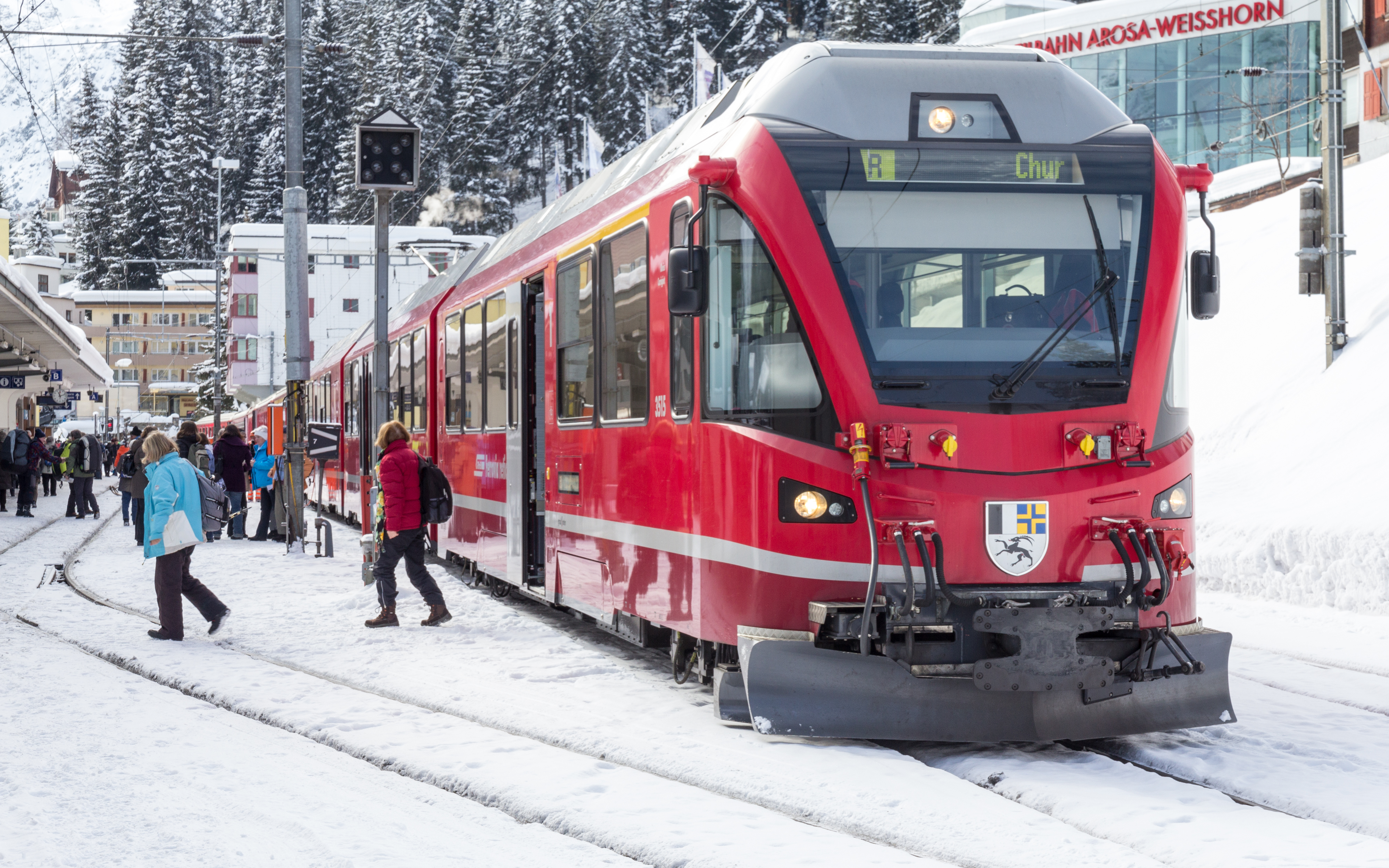
Arosa terminus

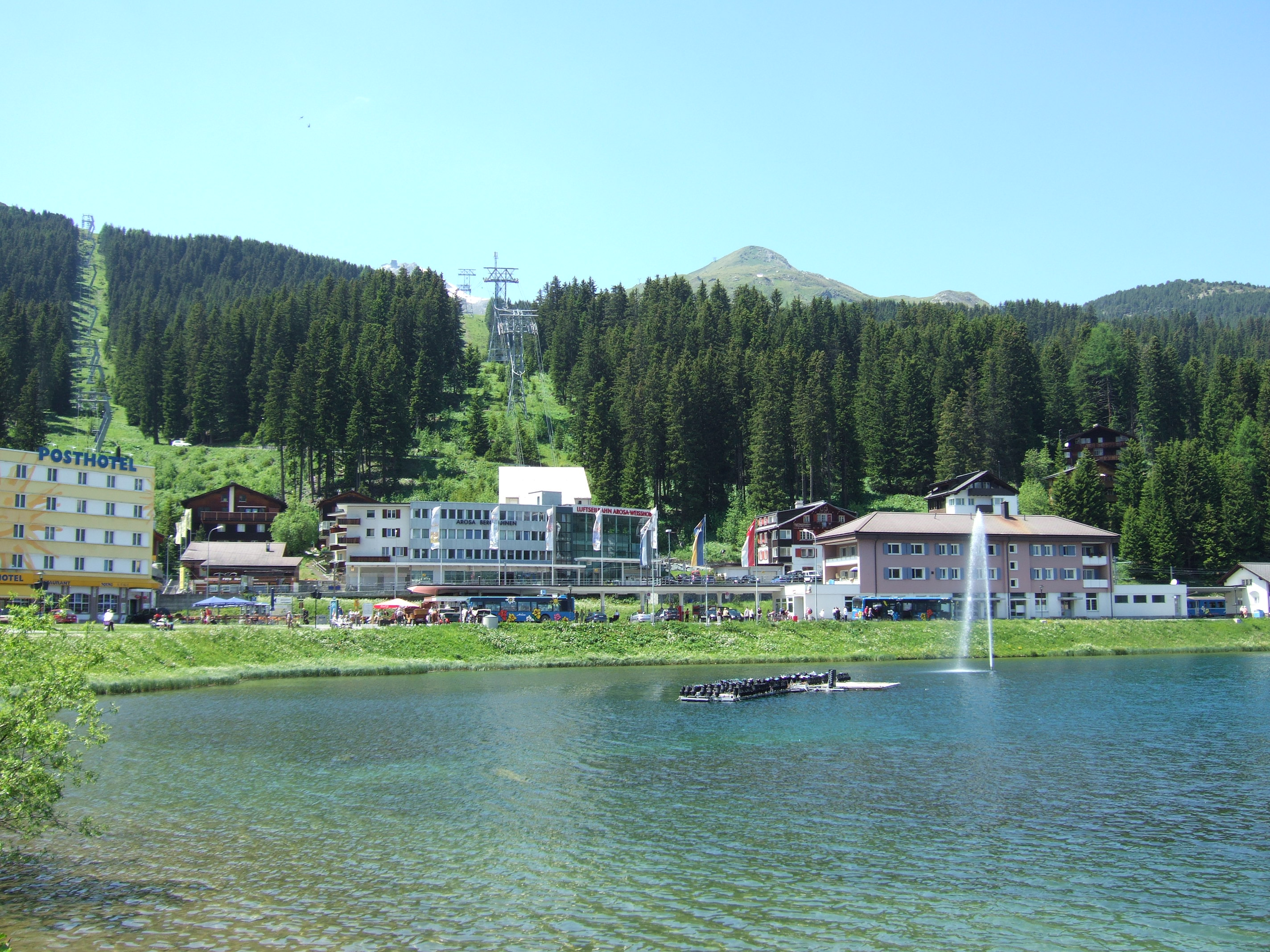
A view of the railway station, with the Obersee in the foreground and the cable car behind

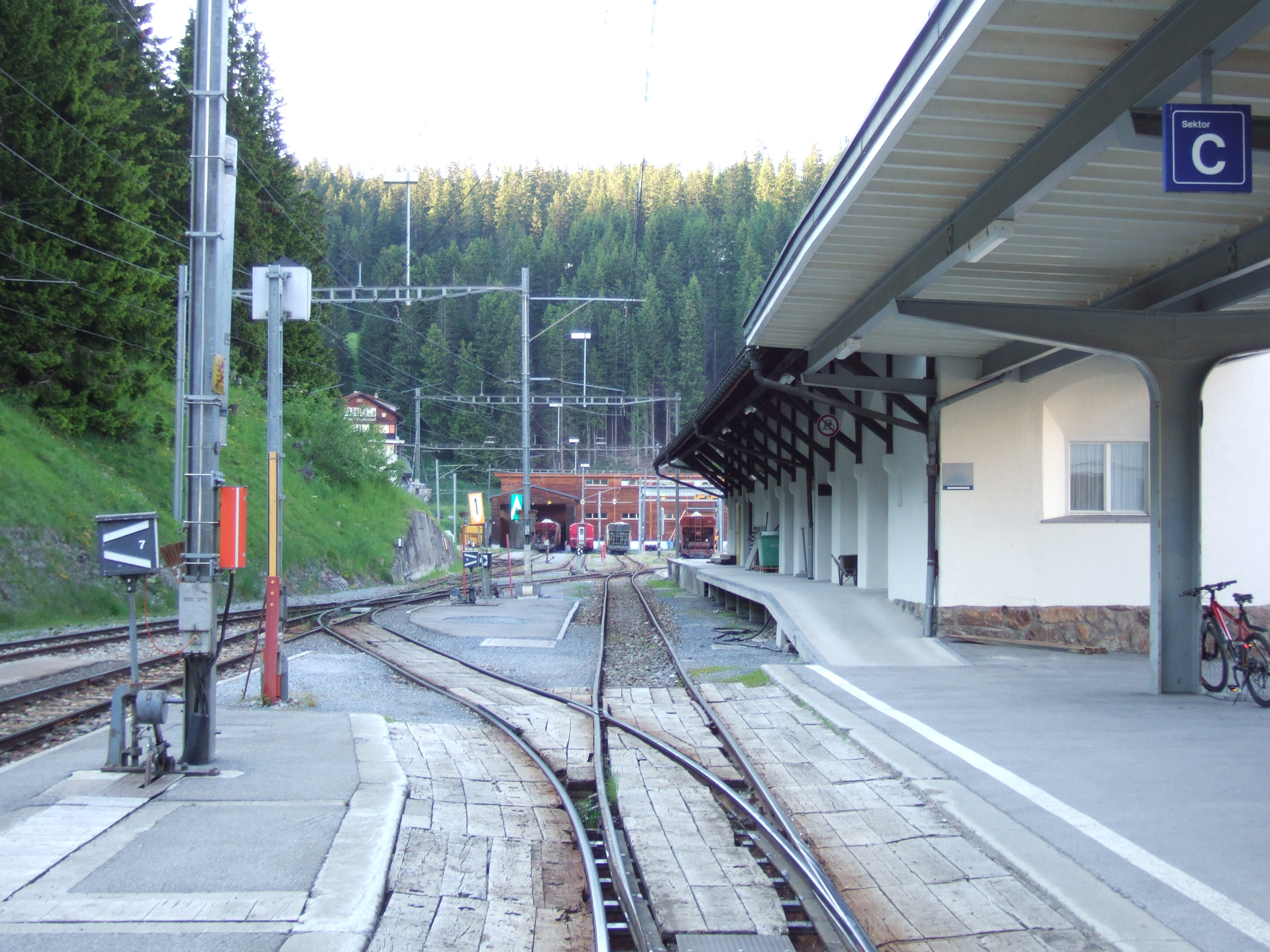
A view of the yard at the top end of the station

== See also ==
- Rail transport in Switzerland
