= Arosa =

- Municipality
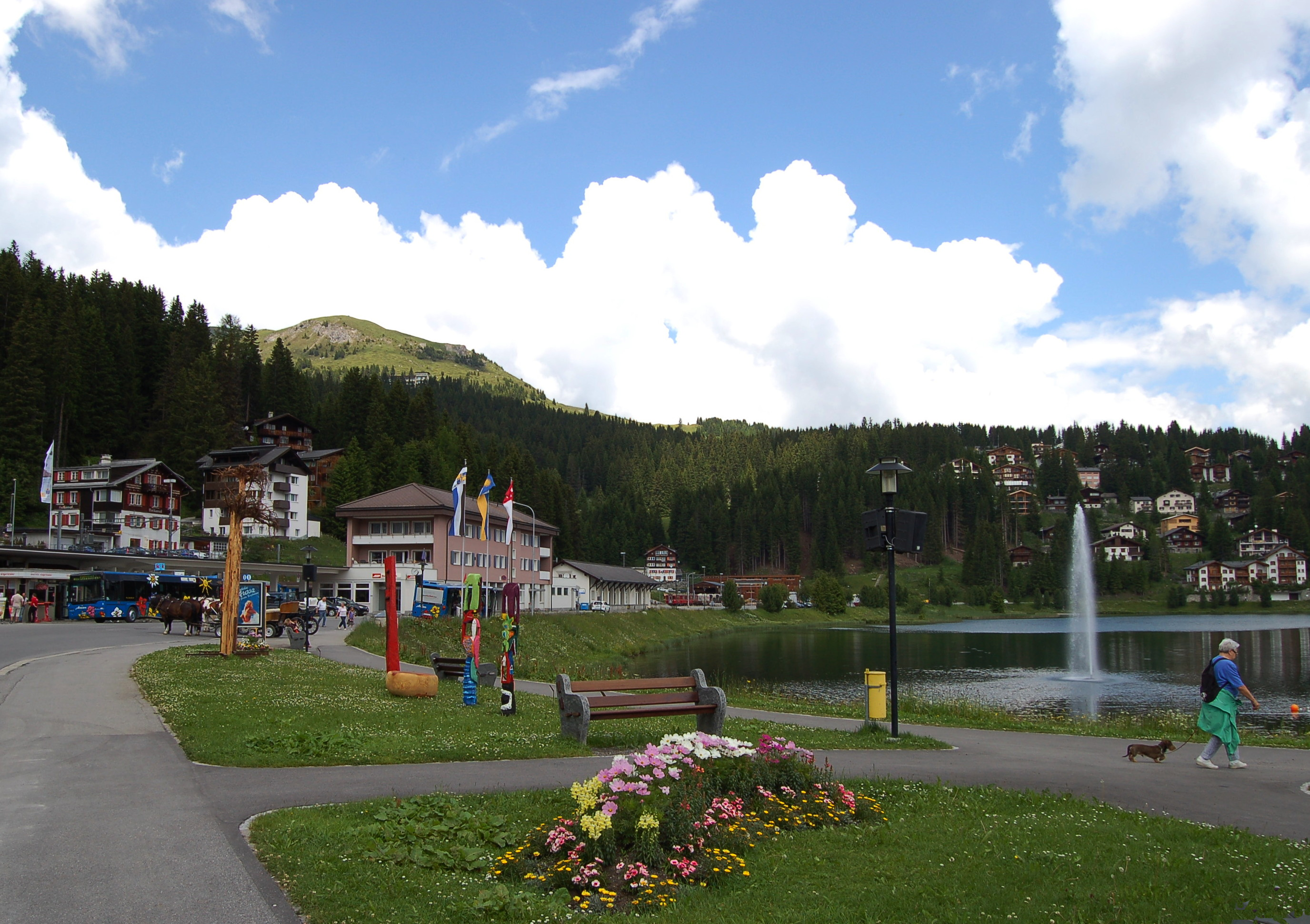
- Arosa in June 2009

- Flag Coat of arms
- Location of Arosa
- Location within Switzerland Location within Canton of Grisons
- Coordinates: 46°47′N 9°41′E
- Country: Switzerland
- Canton: Grisons
- District: Plessur

Government
  - Executive: Gemeindevorstand with 5 members
  - Mayor: Gemeindepräsident; Lorenzo Schmid CVP/PDC (as of 2017)
  - Parliament: Gemeindeparlament with 14 members

Area
  - Total: 154.79 km^{2} (59.76 sq mi)
- Elevation (Bahnhof Arosa): 1,775 m (5,823 ft)
- Highest elevation (Aroser Rothorn): 2,980 m (9,780 ft)
- Lowest elevation (Plessur (river) near Calfreisen): 710 m (2,330 ft)

Population (December 2015)
  - Total: 3,205
  - Density: 20.71/km^{2} (53.63/sq mi)
- Demonym: German: Aroser(in)
- Time zone: UTC+01:00 (CET)
  - Summer (DST): UTC+02:00 (CEST)
- Postal codes: 7050 Arosa, 7027 Calfreisen, 7027 Castiel, 7027 Lüen, 7028 Pagig, 7028 St. Peter, 7029 Peist, 7056 Molinis, 7057 Langwies, 7058 Litzirüti
- SFOS number: 3921
- ISO 3166 code: CH-GR
- Localities: Innerarosa, Maran, Prätschli, Tschuggen
- Surrounded by: Alvaneu, Davos, Langwies, Lantsch/Lenz, Molinis, Peist, Schmitten, Tschiertschen, Vaz/Obervaz, Wiesen
- Twin towns: Fukumitsu (Japan)
- Website: gemeindearosa.ch

Arosa is a town and a municipality in the Plessur Region in the canton of the Grisons in Switzerland. It is both a summer and a winter tourist resort.

On 1 January 2013, the former municipalities of Calfreisen, Castiel, Langwies, Lüen, Molinis, Peist and St. Peter-Pagig merged into the municipality of Arosa.

At the end of 2013 the Arosa ski resort was linked with Lenzerheide by cable-car, creating the new ski resort of Arosa Lenzerheide; since that change, transport passes have been valid in both resorts.

The resort is known throughout Switzerland for its famous ice hockey team, the EHC Arosa which used to be one of the most successful teams in the country.

== History ==
Arosa is first mentioned about 1330 as Araus. In 1383 it was mentioned as Orossen and in 1428 it was first mentioned as Arosa.

The first known settlements are from the 13th century. After 1300 Arosa German-speaking Walser settlers came from Davos and replaced the original Romansh-speaking inhabitants. During the following centuries, the village had a subsistence alpine pasture economy. Until 1851 it was politically a part of the Davos municipality. Arosa was established as a health resort by a German doctor in 1883, and the first sanatorium was opened in 1888. From 1900 on it gradually developed as a winter resort. In 1938 the first ski lifts were built, and in 1956 the Weisshorn cable car was opened and further rope and chair lifts followed.

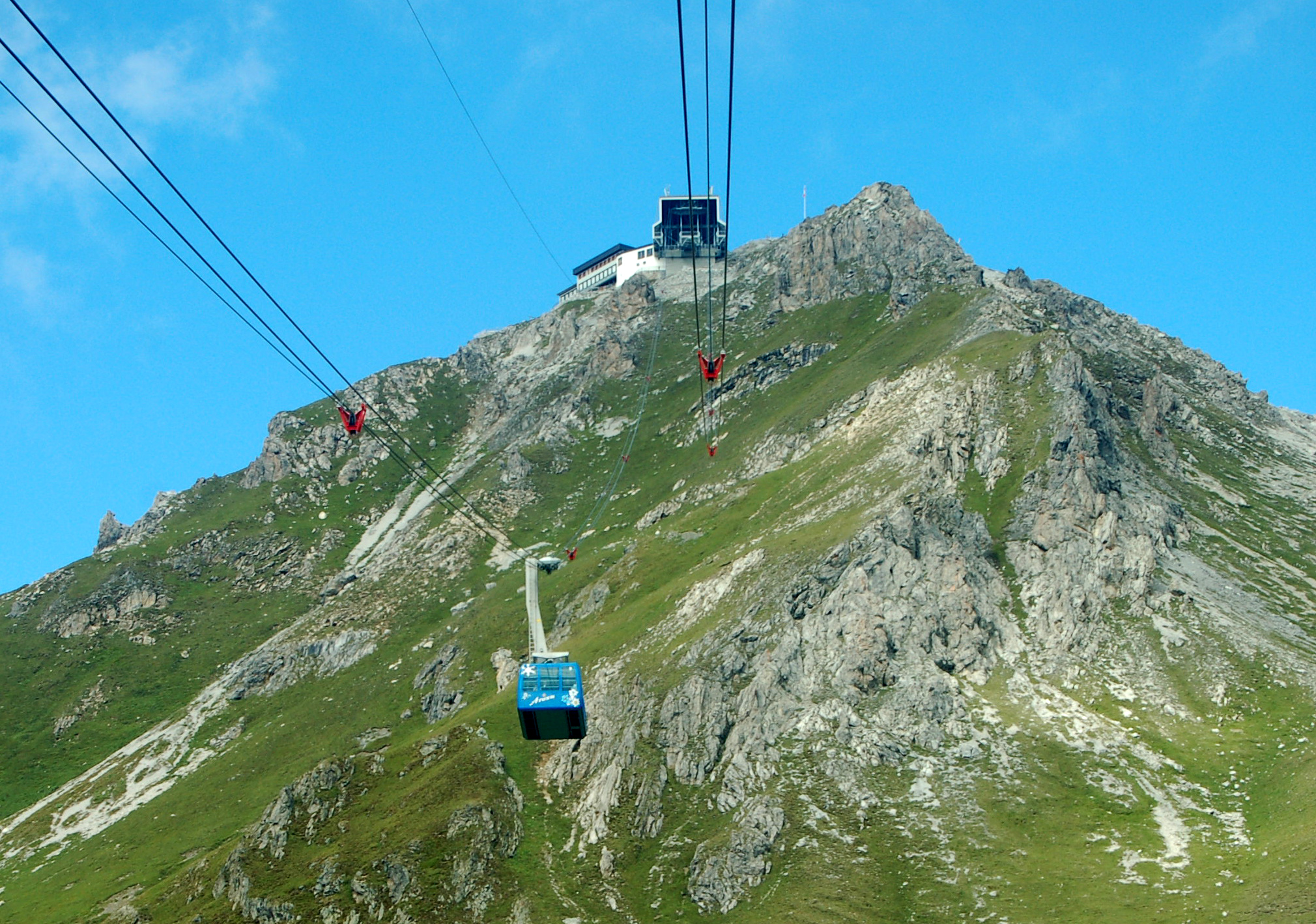
Aroser Weisshorn

Aerial view from 1900 m by Walter Mittelholzer (1927)

In 1851 Arosa separated from the municipality of Davos.

Skiing in Switzerland received a big boost from Sir Arthur Conan Doyle, author of the Sherlock Holmes series. Conan Doyle, an avid sportsman, was wintering in Davos. For entertainment, he ordered some skiing "boards" from Norway and hiked up the mountain with two local guides. They then skied down into Arosa, ending their journey with a luncheon at a local inn, the Seehof, the first hotel in Arosa. Conan Doyle wrote of his pioneering Davos/Arosa ski adventure in a British magazine, The Strand, in 1894, and the story attracted British skiers to Switzerland.

Erwin Schrödinger was vacationing in Arosa at Christmas 1925 when he made his breakthrough discovery of wave mechanics.

In 1933, Thomas Mann stayed in Arosa during the first week of his Swiss exile.

The 1939 film Over the Moon (shot 1937–9) has brief Technicolor exterior shots of the train station and ski resort areas.

On 20 February 1940, Germany's Hassall met with British J. Lonsdale Bryant in Arosa, to make a plan to overthrow the ruling German Nazi Adolf Hitler.

The Cinema Museum in London holds film of the resort from 1959.

== Geography ==
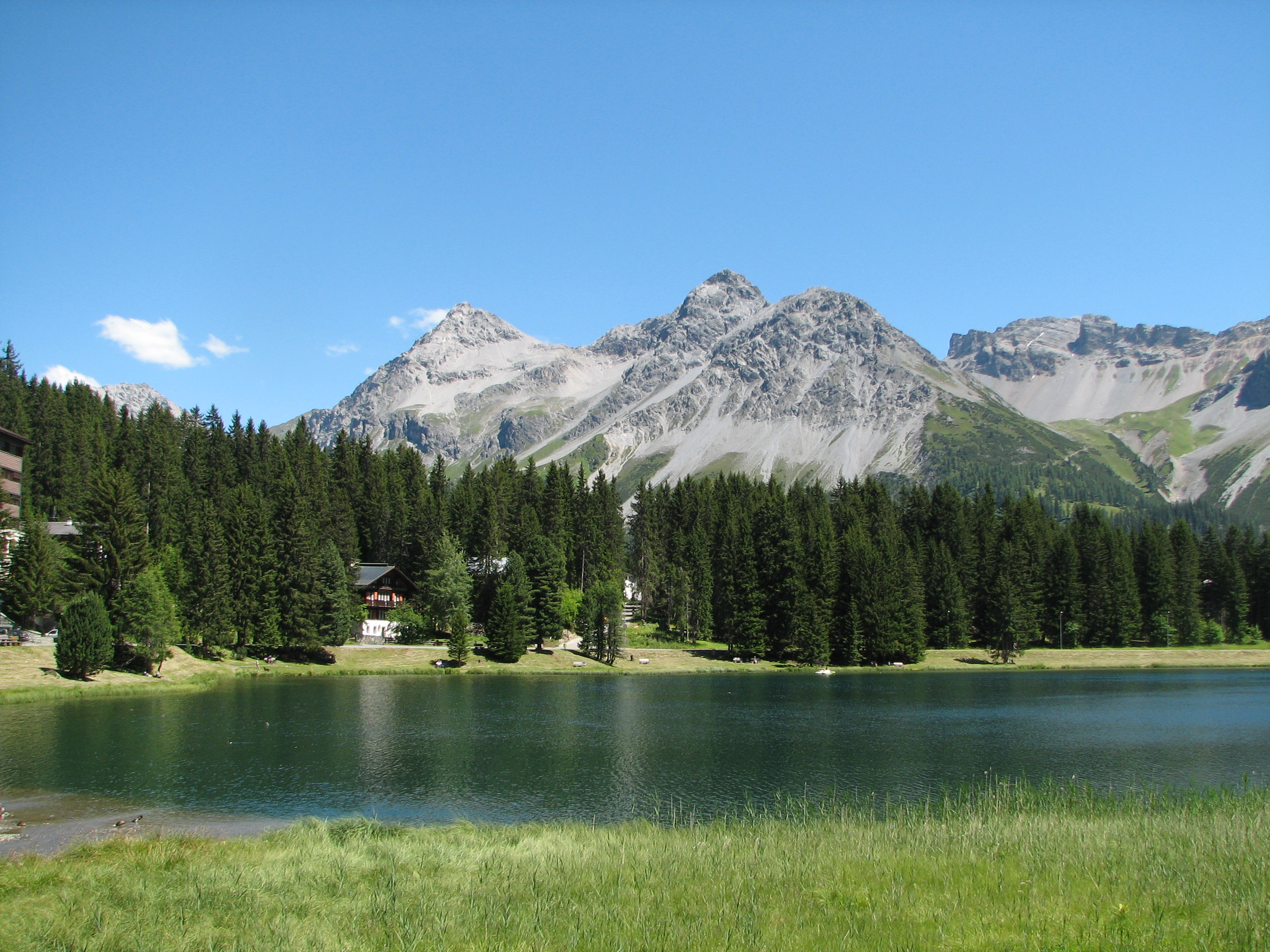
Obersee

The municipality of Arosa has an area of 42.6 km^{2} (16.4 sq mi). Of this, 42% is used for agriculture, and 15.2% is forested. 3.1% is settled (buildings and roads) and the remainder (39.7%) includes the rivers, glaciers and mountains which attract tourists which constitute the primary industry.

Before 2017, the municipality was in the Schanfigg sub-district of the Plessur district, after that date it was part of the Plessur Region. Located on the south-east slope of the Weisshorn chain, the town of Arosa is at the top of the Schanfigg valley at the foot of the Aroser Weisshorn (2,653 m (8,704 ft)). Adjoining are the areas of Innerarosa, Dorf-Obersee, Untersee and Maran-Prätschli at an elevation of 1,690 and 1,950 meters (5,540 and 6,400 ft).

The two lakes in the centre of Arosa are the Obersee (upper lake) and Untersee. The town's railway station is at the end of a branch line from Chur.

== Tourism ==
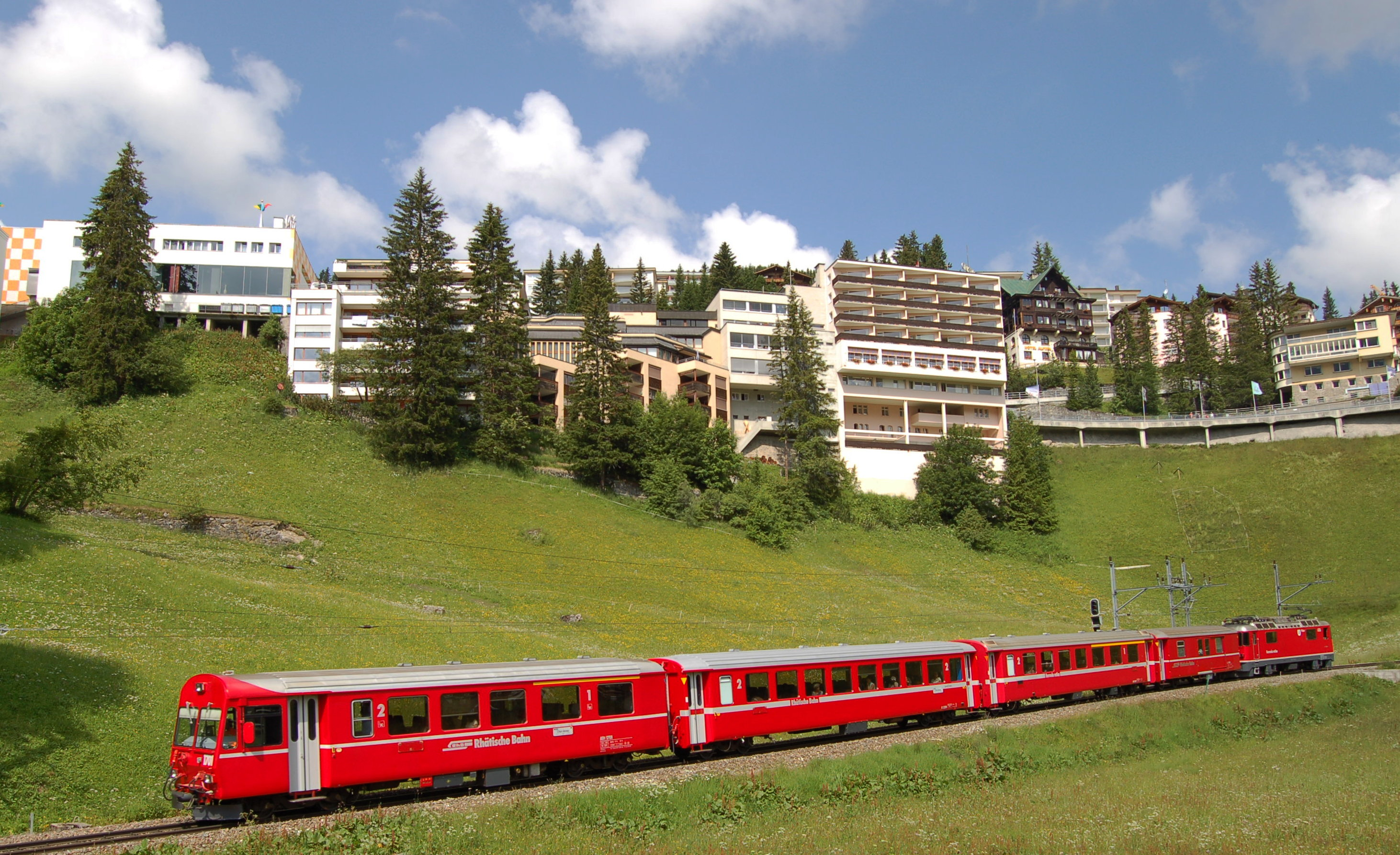
A RhB train travelling through Arosa

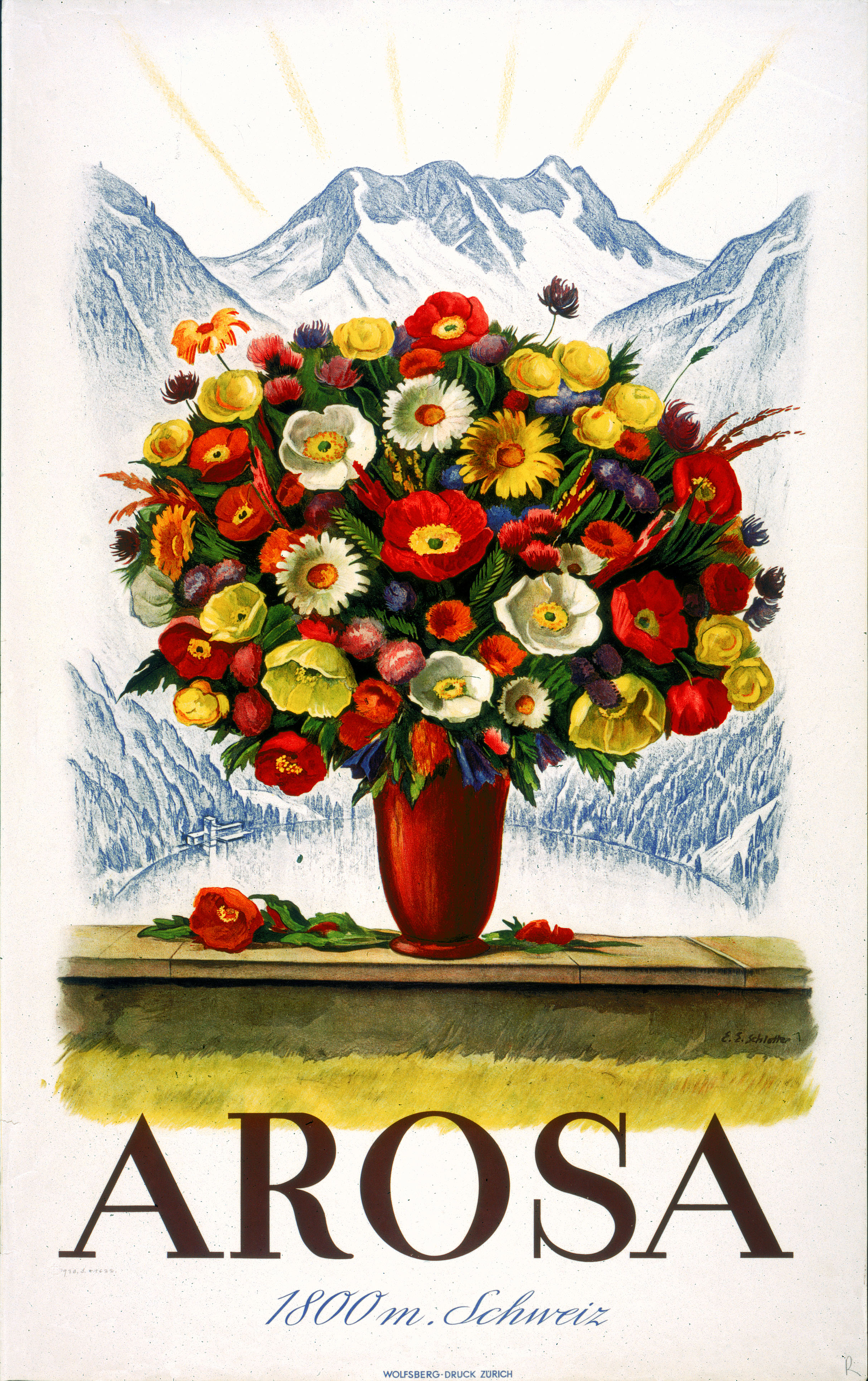
Poster, around 1936

Arosa has a well-known skiing area, which includes over 60 kilometers (37 mi) of slopes.

The main industry is tourism: there are 4287 guest beds. Arosa has an unemployment rate of 1.32%. As of 2005, there were only 4 people employed in the primary economic sector and about 2 businesses involved in this sector. 308 people are employed in the secondary sector and there are 30 businesses in this sector. 1,202 people are employed in the tertiary sector, with 185 businesses in this sector.

== Demographics ==
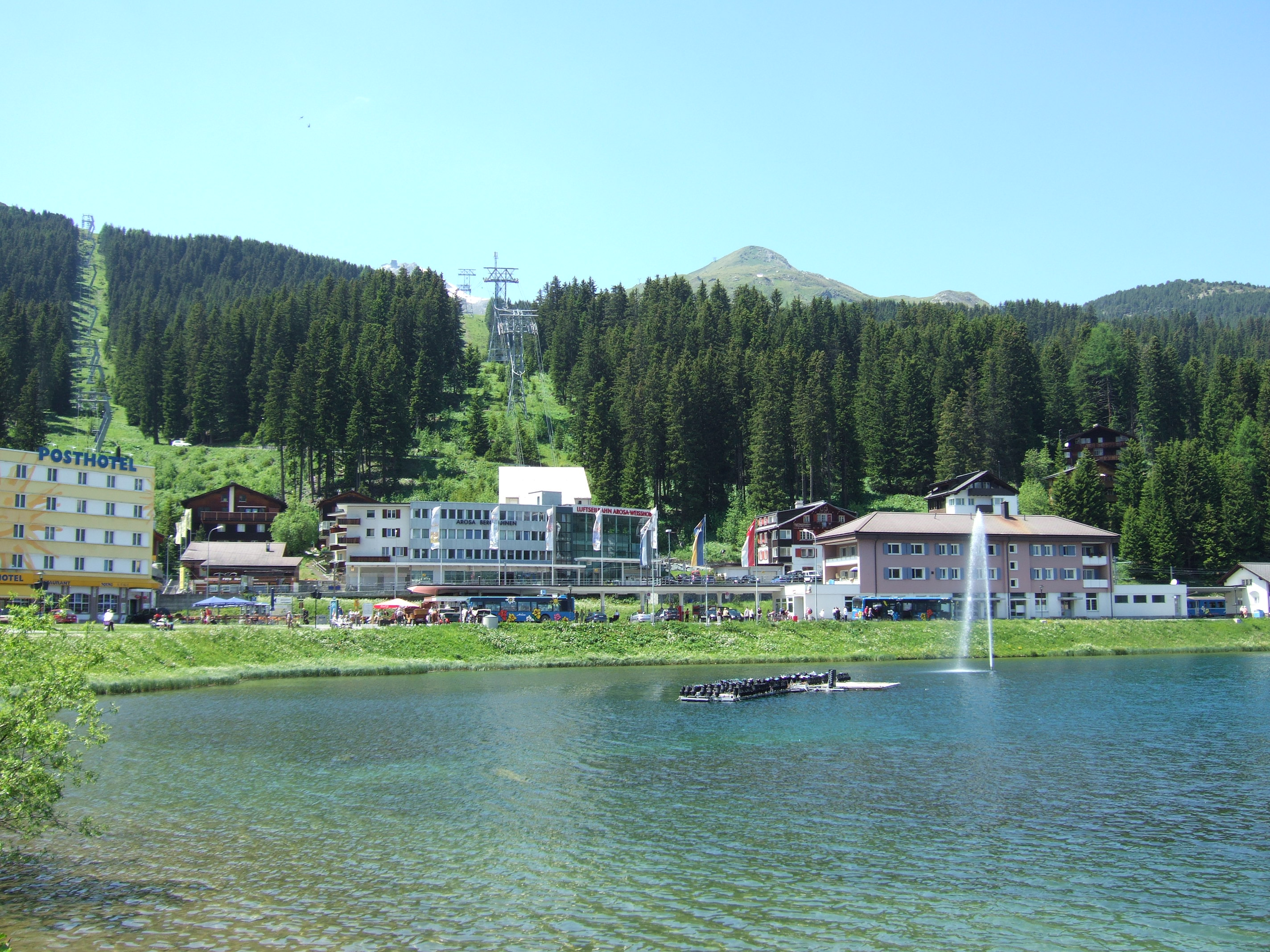
The railway station and cable car, by the Obersee

Arosa has a year-round population (as of December 2020) of 3,162. As of 2008, 22.0% of the population was made up of foreign nationals. Over the last 10 years the population has decreased by 9.8%, but fluctuates seasonally from about 4600 in January to about 2500 in May. Most of the population (as of 2000) speak German (79.8%), with Portuguese being second most common language (7.3%) and Italian third (4.1%).

As of 2000, there were 51.1% males and 48.9% females. The age distribution, as of 2000, in Arosa is: 7.0% between 0 and 9 years old; 3.2% are 10 to 14; 4.5% are 15 to 19. 26.2% are between 20 and 29 years old. 18.0% are 30 to 39, 14.5% are 40 to 49, 11.6% are 50 to 59. 7.0% are between 60 and 69 years old, 4.9% are 70 to 79, 2.3% are 80 to 89, and 0.6% are 90 to 99.

In the 2007 federal election the most popular party was the SVP which received 45% of the vote. The next three most popular parties were the FDP (24.7%), the SP (17%) and the CVP (12%).

In Arosa about 70.3% of the population between age 25-64 have completed either non-mandatory upper secondary education or additional higher education (either university or a Fachhochschule).

From the 2000 census, 1,140 or 41.1% are Roman Catholic, while 1,150 or 41.5% belonged to the Swiss Reformed Church. 109 individuals (or about 3.9% of the population) belong to the Orthodox Church, and 17 individuals (about 0.6% of the population) who belong to another Christian church. The remainder belong to other religions or did not specify a religion.

The historical population is given in the following table:

year	population
1550–1750	c. 125
1850	52
1900	1,071
1930	3,466
1941	1,980
2000	2,771

== Heritage sites of national significance ==
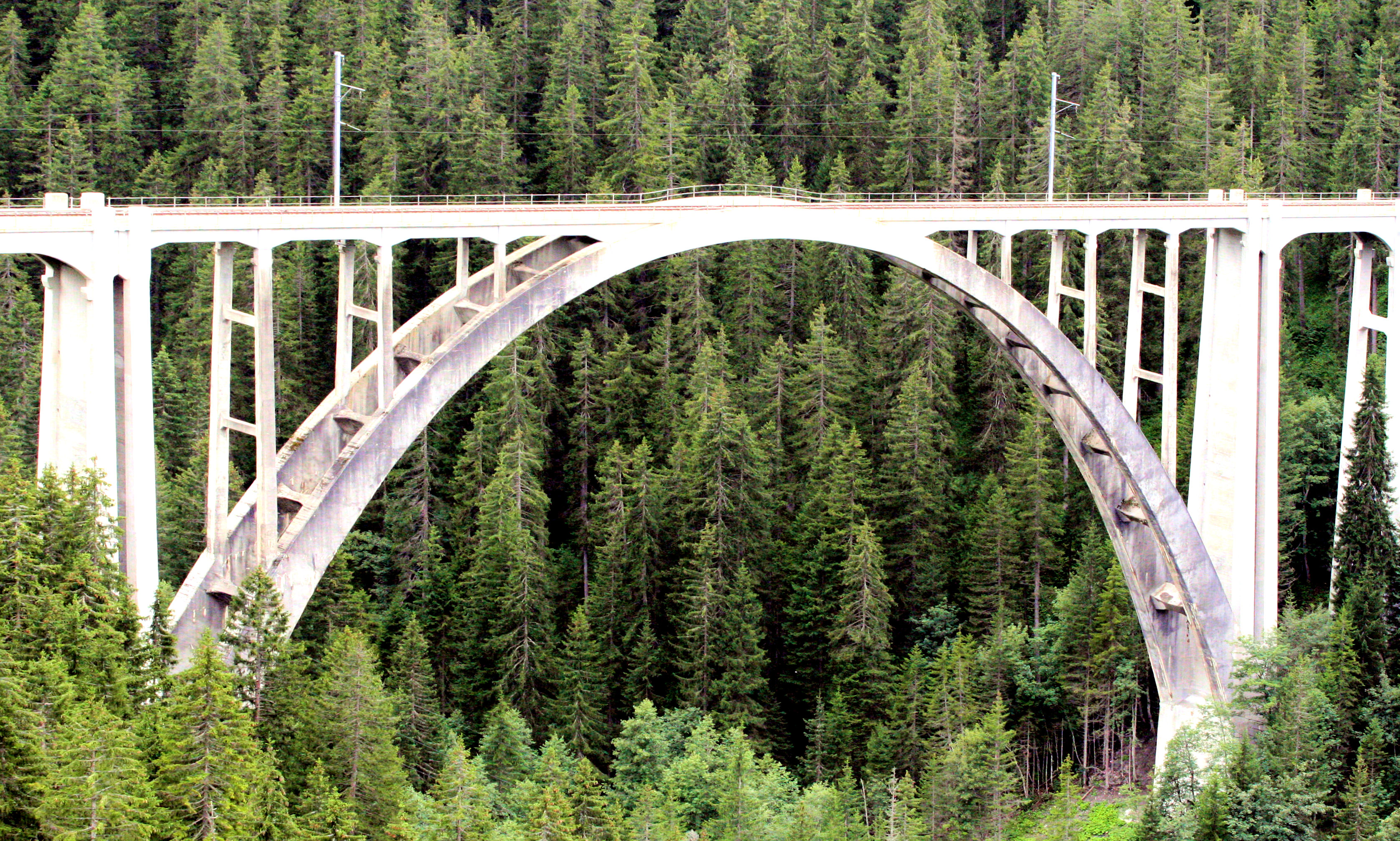
Langwieser Viaduct near Langwies

The archeological site of Carschlingg near Castiel, a prehistoric, late-Roman and Early Middle Ages settlement, and the Langwieser Viaduct for the Rhätische Bahn are listed as Swiss heritage site of national significance. The hamlets of Medergen, Sapün and Strassberg are all part of the Inventory of Swiss Heritage Sites.

== Climate ==
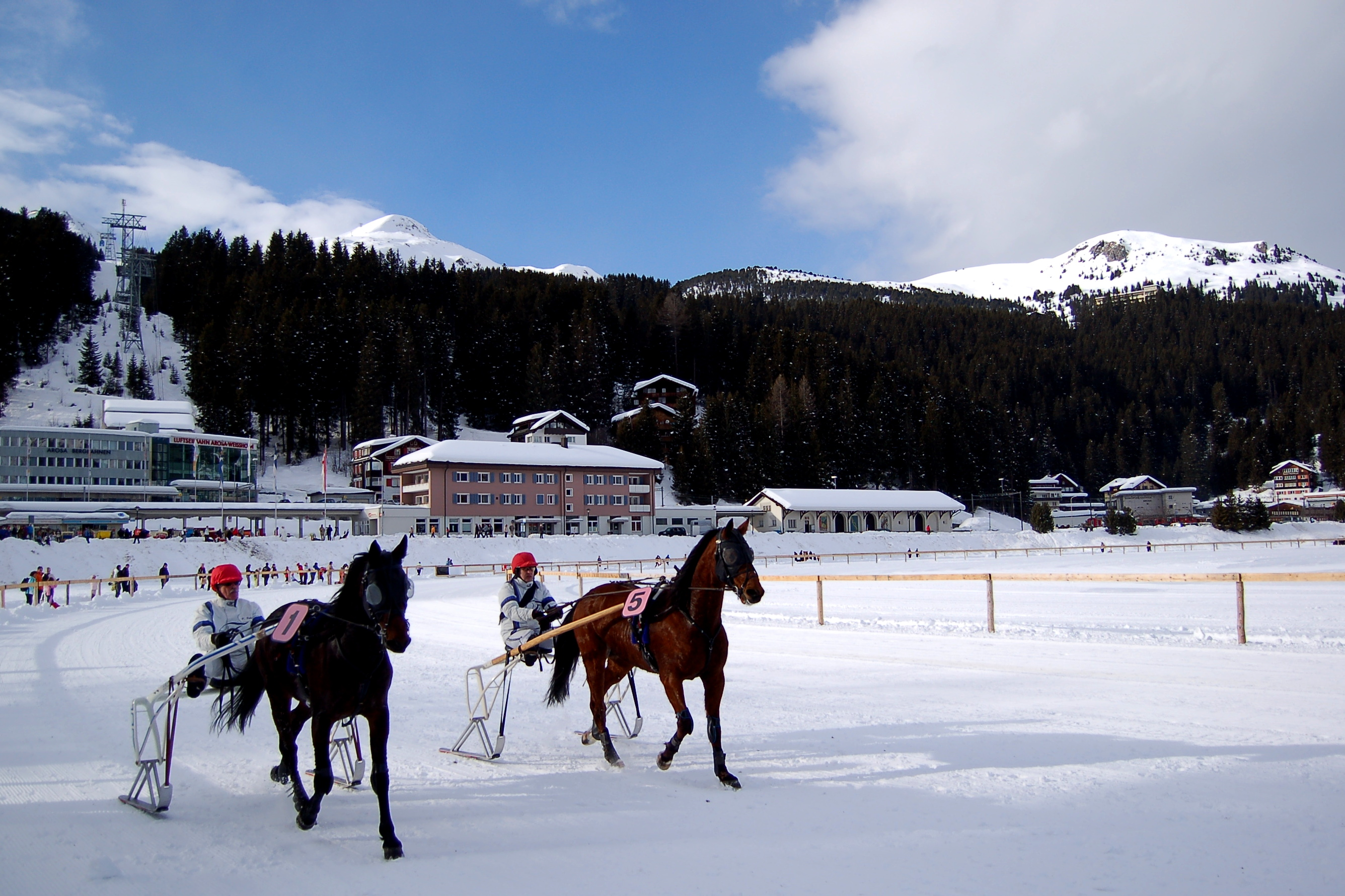
Horse racing on the frozen Obersee in winter

Arosa experiences a subarctic climate (Köppen: Dfc) similar to that of Valdez, Alaska, with short, cool summers, and long cold, but not severely cold winters. Precipitation is abundant year round, and so is snowfall, with annual totals averaging 285 inches (723 cm).

Between 1961 and 1990 Arosa had an average of 147 days of rain per year and on average received 1,335 mm (52.6 in) of precipitation. The wettest month was August, with an average of 159 mm (6.3 in) of precipitation and an average of 14.5 days with rain. The month with the most days of precipitation was June, with 15.6, but with only 147 mm (5.8 in) of precipitation. The driest month of the year was February with 75 mm (3.0 in) of precipitation over 14.5 days.

Climate data for Arosa, elevation 1,878 m (6,161 ft), (1991–2020 normals, extremes 2016–present)
Month	Jan	Feb	Mar	Apr	May	Jun	Jul	Aug	Sep	Oct	Nov	Dec	Year
Record high °C (°F)	9.8 (49.6)	10.8 (51.4)	12.0 (53.6)	17.1 (62.8)	20.9 (69.6)	26.2 (79.2)	25.1 (77.2)	26.2 (79.2)	21.7 (71.1)	20.7 (69.3)	14.6 (58.3)	11.8 (53.2)	26.2 (79.2)
Mean daily maximum °C (°F)	−0.5 (31.1)	−0.4 (31.3)	2.1 (35.8)	5.1 (41.2)	9.7 (49.5)	13.7 (56.7)	15.7 (60.3)	15.7 (60.3)	11.7 (53.1)	8.6 (47.5)	3.4 (38.1)	0.2 (32.4)	7.1 (44.8)
Daily mean °C (°F)	−3.4 (25.9)	−3.8 (25.2)	−1.4 (29.5)	1.8 (35.2)	6.1 (43.0)	9.9 (49.8)	11.8 (53.2)	11.9 (53.4)	8.3 (46.9)	5.3 (41.5)	0.5 (32.9)	−2.5 (27.5)	3.7 (38.7)
Mean daily minimum °C (°F)	−6.7 (19.9)	−7.5 (18.5)	−5.0 (23.0)	−1.6 (29.1)	2.5 (36.5)	5.8 (42.4)	7.8 (46.0)	8.2 (46.8)	4.6 (40.3)	1.6 (34.9)	−2.8 (27.0)	−5.7 (21.7)	0.1 (32.2)
Record low °C (°F)	−16.9 (1.6)	−24.7 (−12.5)	−14.2 (6.4)	−12.8 (9.0)	−7.6 (18.3)	−0.5 (31.1)	−0.1 (31.8)	0.3 (32.5)	−4.1 (24.6)	−6.0 (21.2)	−11.1 (12.0)	−16.5 (2.3)	−24.7 (−12.5)
Average precipitation mm (inches)	77.1 (3.04)	64.7 (2.55)	73.3 (2.89)	77.0 (3.03)	97.0 (3.82)	132.3 (5.21)	136.1 (5.36)	157.8 (6.21)	103.8 (4.09)	89.7 (3.53)	90.0 (3.54)	80.3 (3.16)	1,179.1 (46.42)
Average snowfall cm (inches)	116.2 (45.7)	105.3 (41.5)	100.2 (39.4)	78.0 (30.7)	25.4 (10.0)	5.6 (2.2)	1.6 (0.6)	2.4 (0.9)	11.9 (4.7)	42.5 (16.7)	90.5 (35.6)	113.9 (44.8)	693.5 (273.0)
Average precipitation days (≥ 1.0 mm)	10.6	9.5	11.2	10.9	13.0	14.2	14.0	13.9	10.7	9.4	10.6	11.0	139.0
Average snowy days (≥ 1.0 cm)	12.8	11.9	12.2	9.5	4.3	1.0	0.4	0.4	2.0	4.6	10.9	13.2	83.2
Average relative humidity (%)	64	66	68	69	71	72	72	73	73	67	68	66	69
Mean monthly sunshine hours	110.3	112.9	141.5	147.6	155.1	170.3	196.8	184.3	152.5	135.7	96.2	90.0	1,693.2
Percentage possible sunshine	53	50	47	43	39	42	48	50	49	52	45	46	47
Source 1: NOAA
Source 2: MeteoSwiss Infoclimat (extremes)

== Transportation ==
The Rhaetian Railway operates frequent train services on the Chur–Arosa railway to Chur.

== Notable people ==
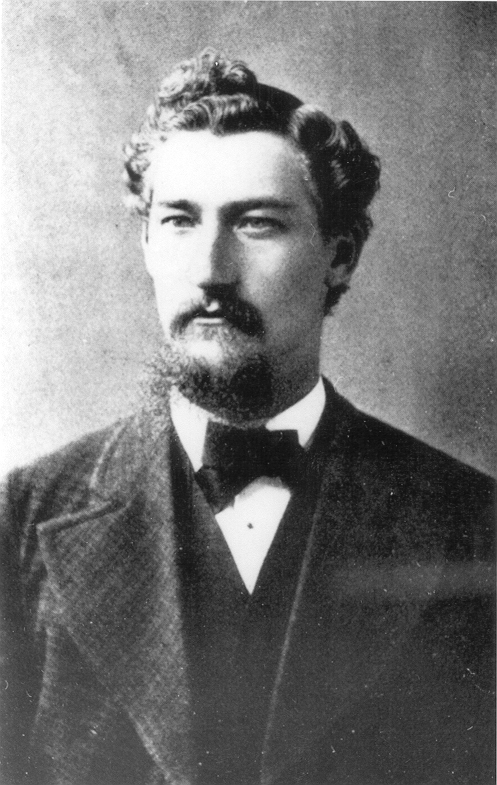
Carl Rüedi ca. 1885

- Carl Rüedi (1848 – 1901 in Arosa), a Swiss pulmonologist, treated author Robert Louis Stevenson
- Egbert Coleby Morland FRCS FRCP (1874–1955), an English physician, he practised as a pulmonary specialist in Switzerland 1903–1914, first at Davos and then in Arosa
- Lieutenant Alfred Michael Koch MC (born 1894 in Arosa – 1984), a Swiss-born Canadian flying ace credited with ten aerial victories
- Paul ten Bruggencate (1901 in Arosa – 1961), a German astronomer and astrophysicist.
- Karl-Heinz Kipp (1924 – 2017 in Arosa), a German billionaire, lived in Arosa and owned the Tschuggen Grand Hotel
- Youri Messen-Jaschin (born 1941 in Arosa), an artist of Latvian origin, he often combines oils and gouaches.

Sport

- David Zogg (1902–1977), a Swiss alpine and Nordic combined skier. He was raised in Arosa
- Werner Lohrer (1917 in Arosa – 1991), an ice hockey player, bronze medallist at the 1948 Winter Olympics
- Heini Lohrer (1918 in Arosa – 2011), an ice hockey player, bronze medallist at the 1948 Winter Olympics
- Roger Staub (1936 in Arosa – 1974), an alpine ski racer and Olympic gold medalist at the 1960 Winter Olympics
- Werner Geeser (1948 in Arosa – 2011), a Swiss cross-country skier, competed in the 1972 Winter Olympics
- Engelhard Pargätzi (born 1959 in Arosa), a retired Swiss alpine skier who competed in the 1976 Winter Olympics
- Isabel Waidacher (born 1994 in Arosa), a Swiss ice hockey player, six-time Swiss champion with the ZSC Lions Frauen

== See also ==
- 1304 Arosa
