= Strela (mountain) =

Mountain in Switzerland

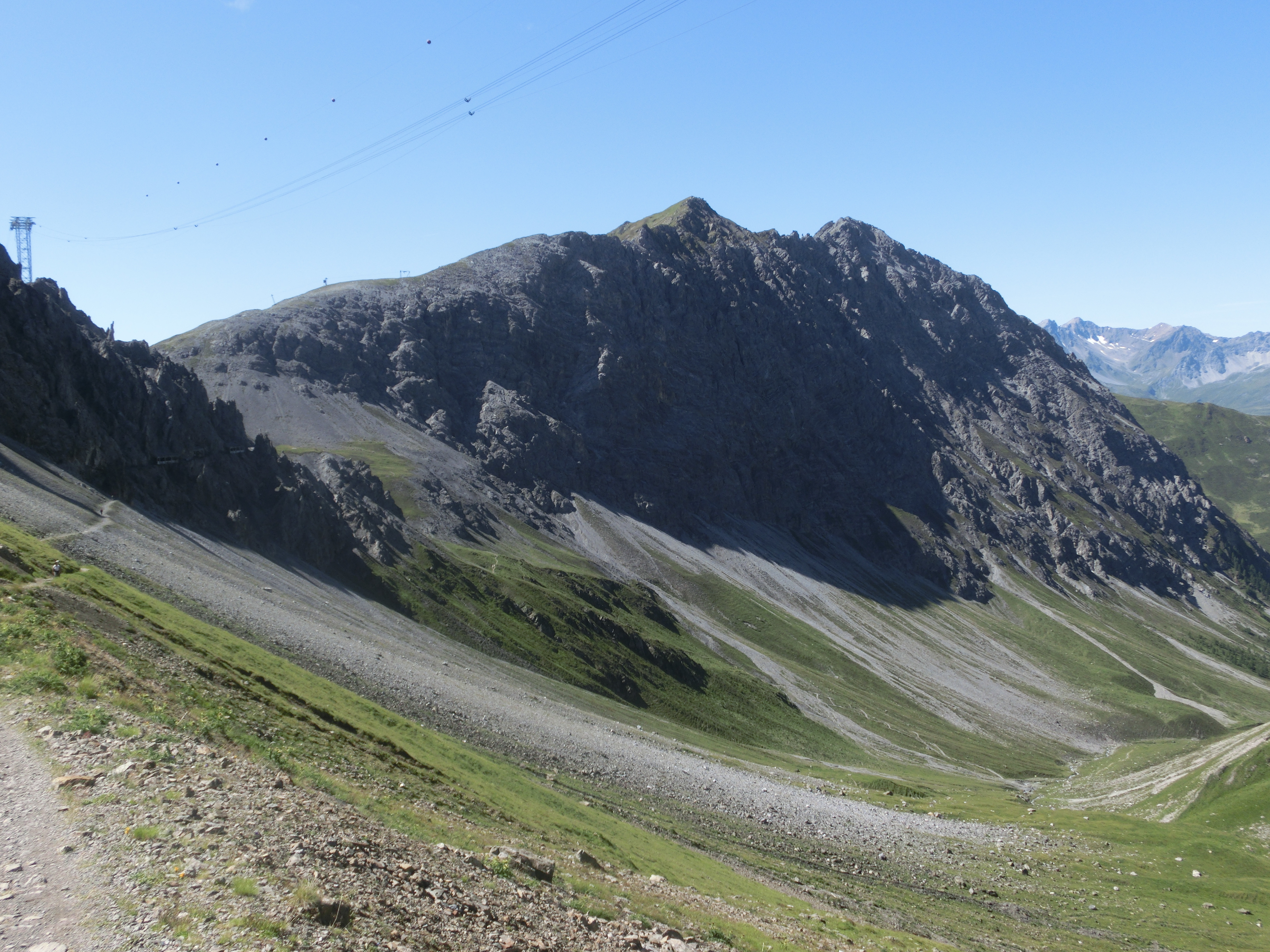
- Strela (left) and Chüpfenflue (right), picture taken from Haupter Tälli

Highest point
- Elevation: 2,636.4 m (8,650 ft)
- Prominence: 55 m (180 ft)
- Parent peak: Aroser Rothorn
- Coordinates: 46°48′32.4″N 9°46′48.72″E

Geography
- Location within Switzerland
- Location: Graubünden, Switzerland
- Parent range: Plessur Alps

The Strela is a mountain of the Plessur Alps, located between Langwies and Davos in the Swiss canton of Graubünden.
