= Sandhubel =

Mountain in Switzerland

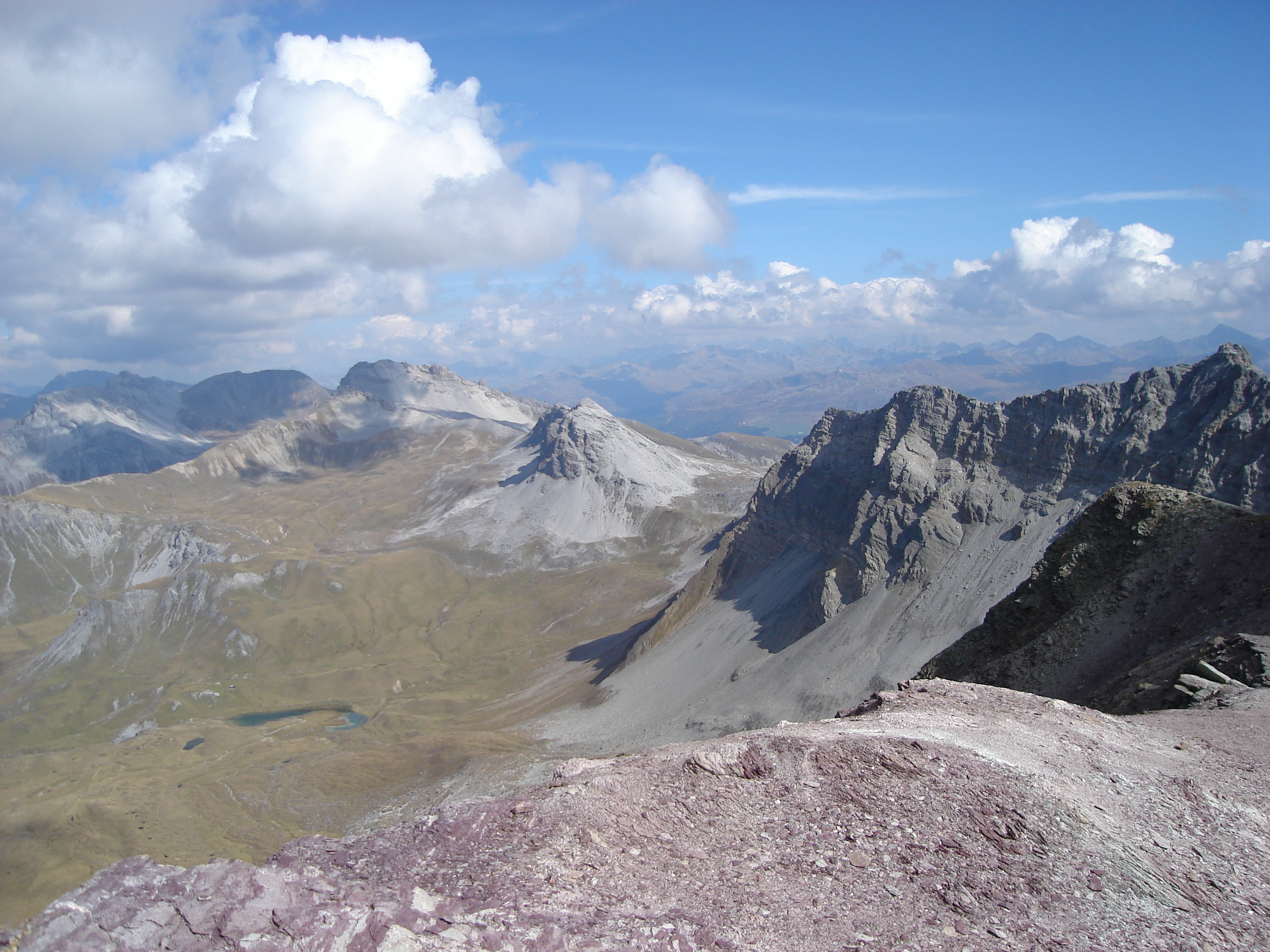
- View from the summit

Highest point
- Elevation: 2,764 m (9,068 ft)
- Prominence: 117 m (384 ft)
- Parent peak: Guggernellgrat
- Coordinates: 46°44′24.2″N 9°41′04.6″E

Geography
- Location within Switzerland
- Location: Graubünden, Switzerland
- Parent range: Plessur Alps

The Sandhubel is a mountain of the Plessur Alps, located south of Arosa in the canton of Graubünden. It lies north of the Guggernellgrat.
