= Älpliseehorn =

Mountain in Switzerland

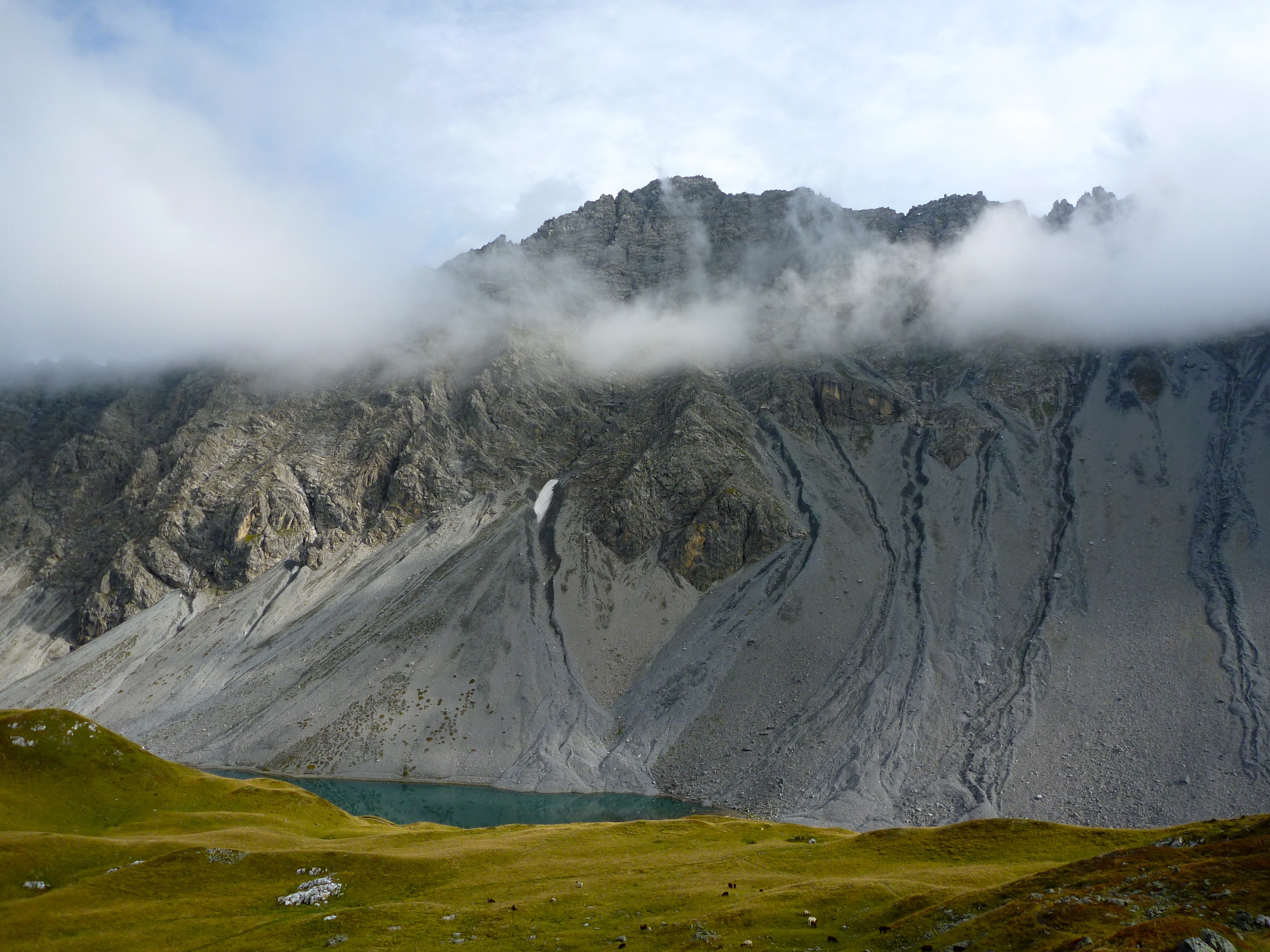
- The Älpliseehorn with the Älplisee (north side)

Highest point
- Elevation: 2,725 m (8,940 ft)
- Prominence: 94 m (308 ft)
- Parent peak: Aroser Rothorn
- Coordinates: 46°44′50.1″N 9°38′51.4″E

Geography
- Location within Switzerland
- Location: Graubünden, Switzerland
- Parent range: Plessur Range

The Älpliseehorn is a mountain of the Plessur Alps, located south of Arosa in Graubünden. It is part of the range east of the Aroser Rothorn. On the north side of the mountain lies the Älplisee.
