= Cunggel =

Mountain in Switzerland

- Location within Switzerland

Highest point
- Elevation: 2,413 m (7,917 ft)
- Prominence: 124 m (407 ft)
- Parent peak: Hochwang
- Coordinates: 46°51′57.3″N 9°40′14.5″E

Geography
- Location: Graubünden, Switzerland
- Parent range: Plessur Alps

The Cunggel is a mountain of the Plessur Alps, overlooking St. Peter in the canton of Graubünden. It lies on the range between the valleys of Schanfigg and Prättigau at a height of 2,413 metres.
