= Schiahorn =

Mountain in Switzerland

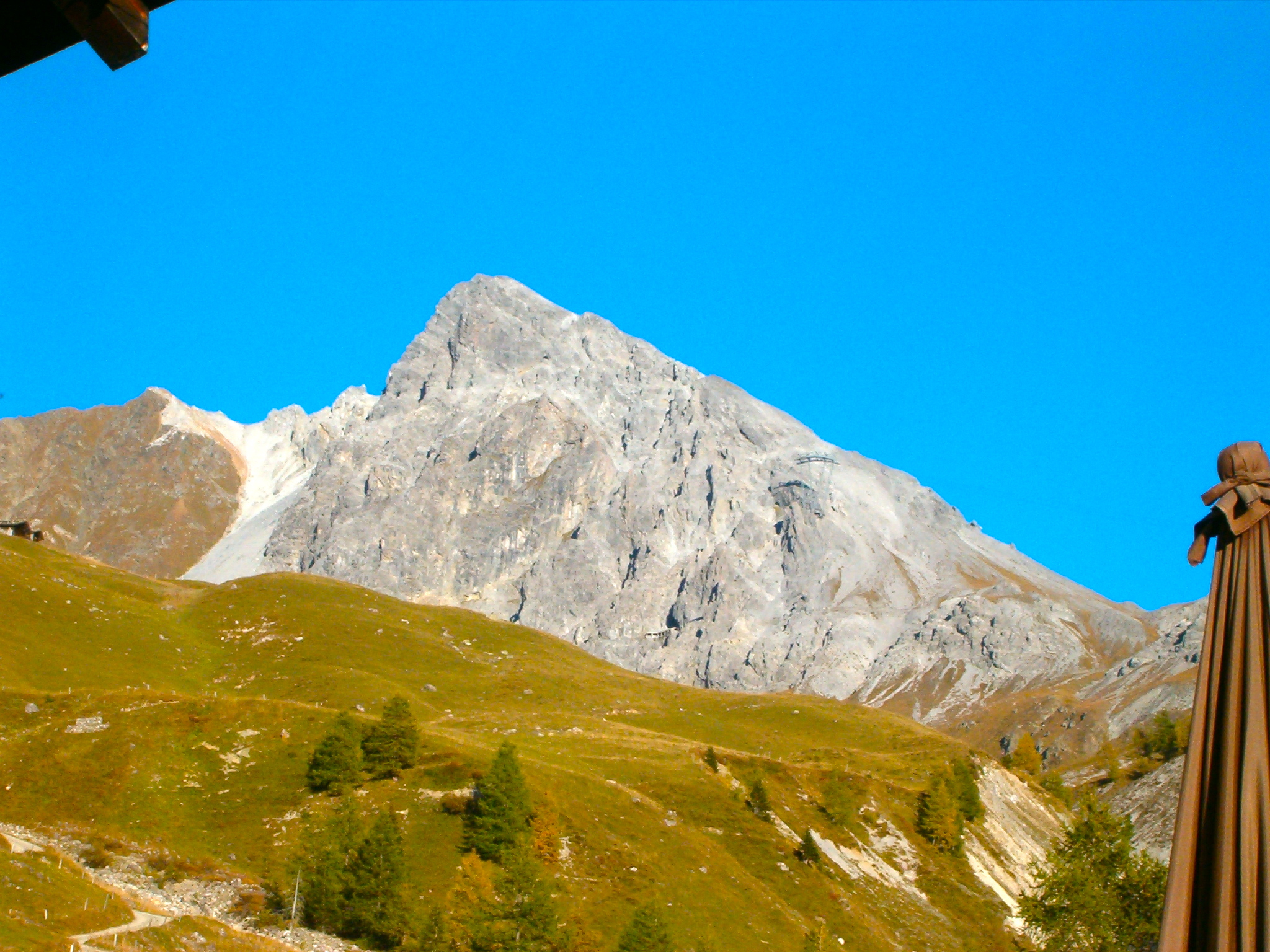
- View from the west side

Highest point
- Elevation: 2,709 m (8,888 ft)
- Prominence: 113 m (371 ft)
- Parent peak: Weissfluh
- Coordinates: 46°49′04.4″N 9°48′14.2″E

Geography
- Location within Switzerland
- Location: Graubünden, Switzerland
- Parent range: Plessur Alps

The Schiahorn is a mountain of the Plessur Alps, overlooking Davos in the canton of Graubünden. The Schiahorn is located just east of the Strela Pass, where the summit normal route starts.
