= Mattjisch Horn =

Mountain in Switzerland

- Location within Switzerland

Highest point
- Elevation: 2,461 m (8,074 ft)
- Prominence: 171 m (561 ft)
- Parent peak: Chistenstein
- Coordinates: 46°51′04.6″N 9°43′24″E

Geography
- Location: Graubünden, Switzerland
- Parent range: Plessur Alps

The Mattjisch Horn is a mountain of the Plessur Alps, overlooking the municipality of Arosa in the Swiss canton of Graubünden. It lies on the range between the valleys of Prättigau and Schanfigg.
