= Chüpfenflue =

Mountain in Switzerland

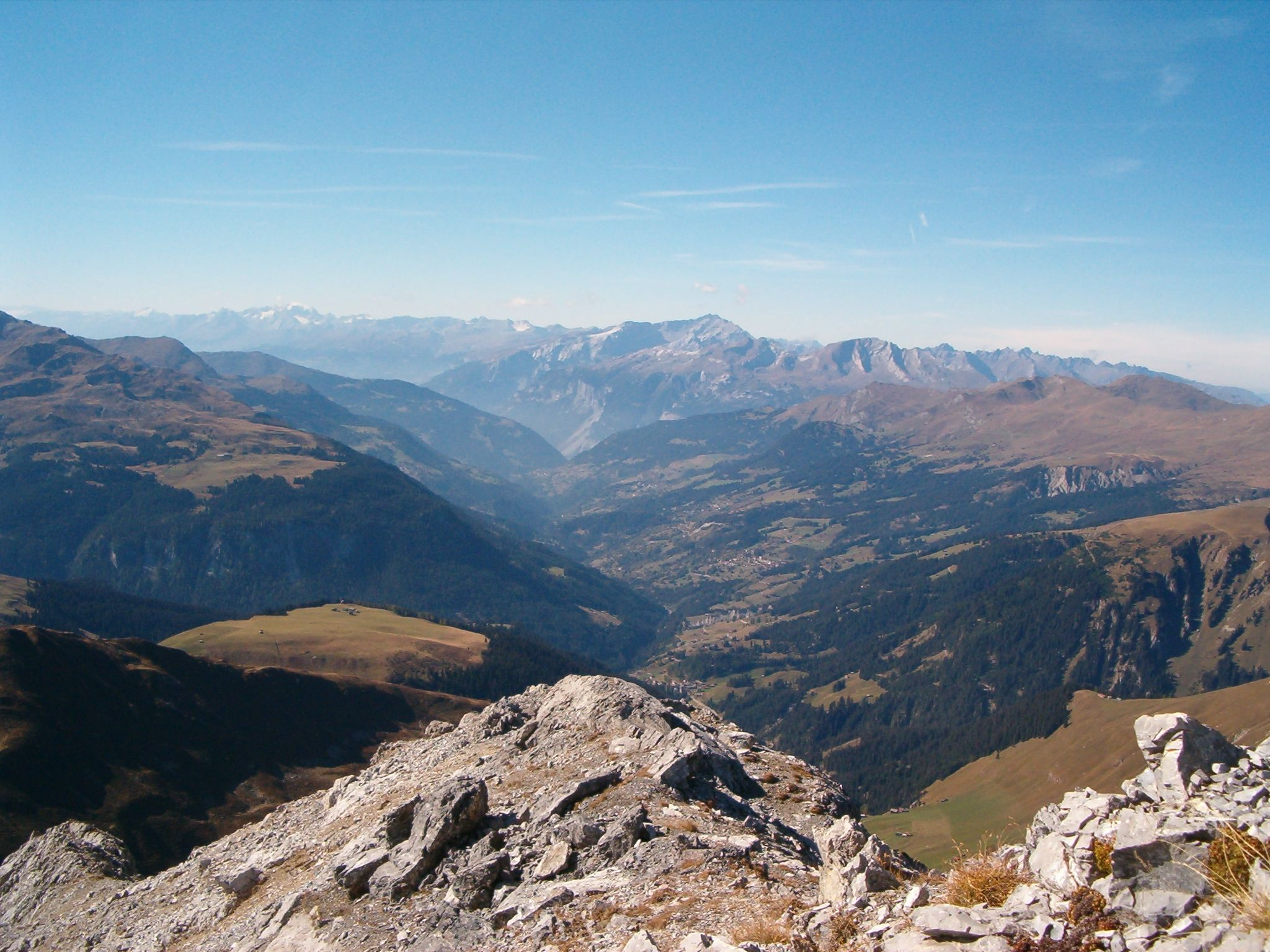
- View from the summit

Highest point
- Elevation: 2,658 m (8,720 ft)
- Prominence: 249 m (817 ft)
- Parent peak: Aroser Rothorn
- Coordinates: 46°48′26.4″N 9°46′33.9″E

Geography
- Location within Switzerland
- Location: Graubünden, Switzerland
- Parent range: Plessur Alps

The Chüpfenflue is a mountain of the Plessur Alps, located between Langwies and Davos in the Swiss canton of Graubünden.
