= Hinteregg =

Mountain in Switzerland

- Location within Switzerland

Highest point
- Elevation: 2,396 m (7,861 ft)
- Prominence: 163 m (535 ft)
- Parent peak: Chistenstein
- Coordinates: 46°52′21″N 9°42′42″E

Geography
- Location: Graubünden, Switzerland
- Parent range: Plessur Alps

The Hinteregg is a mountain of the Plessur Alps, overlooking Fideris in the canton of Graubünden, Switzerland.
