= Ful Berg =

Mountain in Switzerland

- Location within Switzerland

Highest point
- Elevation: 2,395 m (7,858 ft)
- Prominence: 78 m (256 ft)
- Parent peak: Hochwang
- Coordinates: 46°52′17.5″N 9°36′40.2″E

Geography
- Location: Graubünden, Switzerland
- Parent range: Plessur Alps

The Ful Berg is a mountain of the Plessur Alps, located east of Chur in the canton of Graubünden. It lies at the western end of the chain separating the valleys of Prättigau and Schanfigg, just east of the Rhine.
