= Amselflue =

Mountain in Switzerland

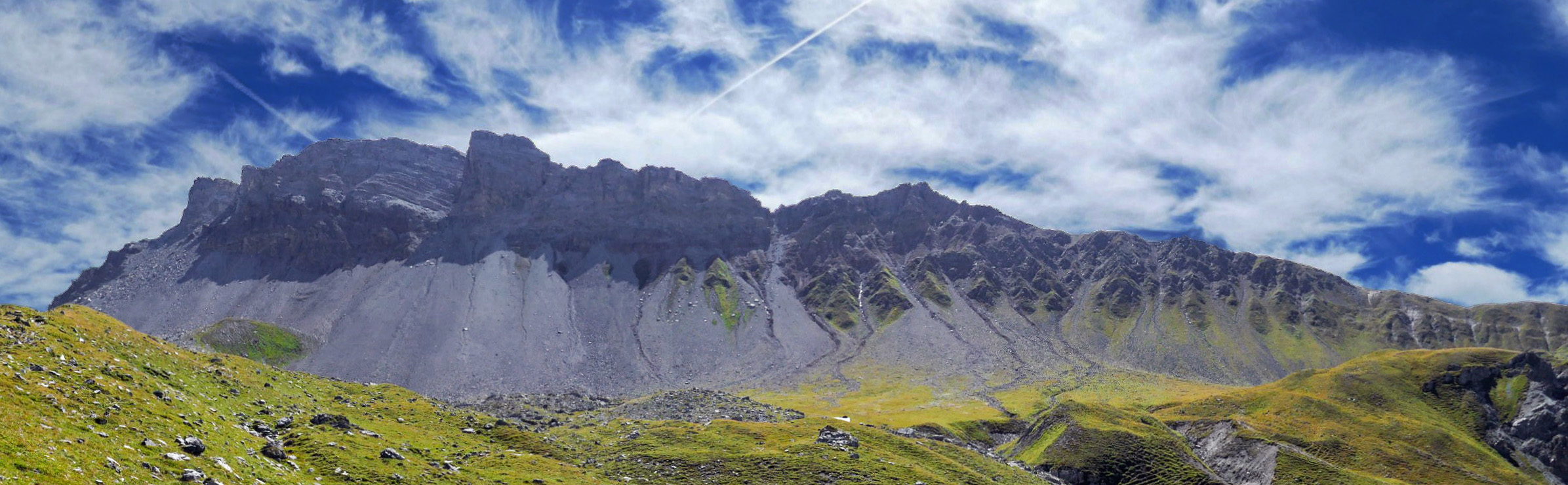
- Amselflue

Highest point
- Elevation: 2,781 m (9,124 ft)
- Prominence: 290 m (950 ft)
- Parent peak: Aroser Rothorn
- Coordinates: 46°45′49.8″N 9°43′44.5″E

Geography
- Location within Switzerland
- Location: Graubünden, Switzerland
- Parent range: Plessur Alps

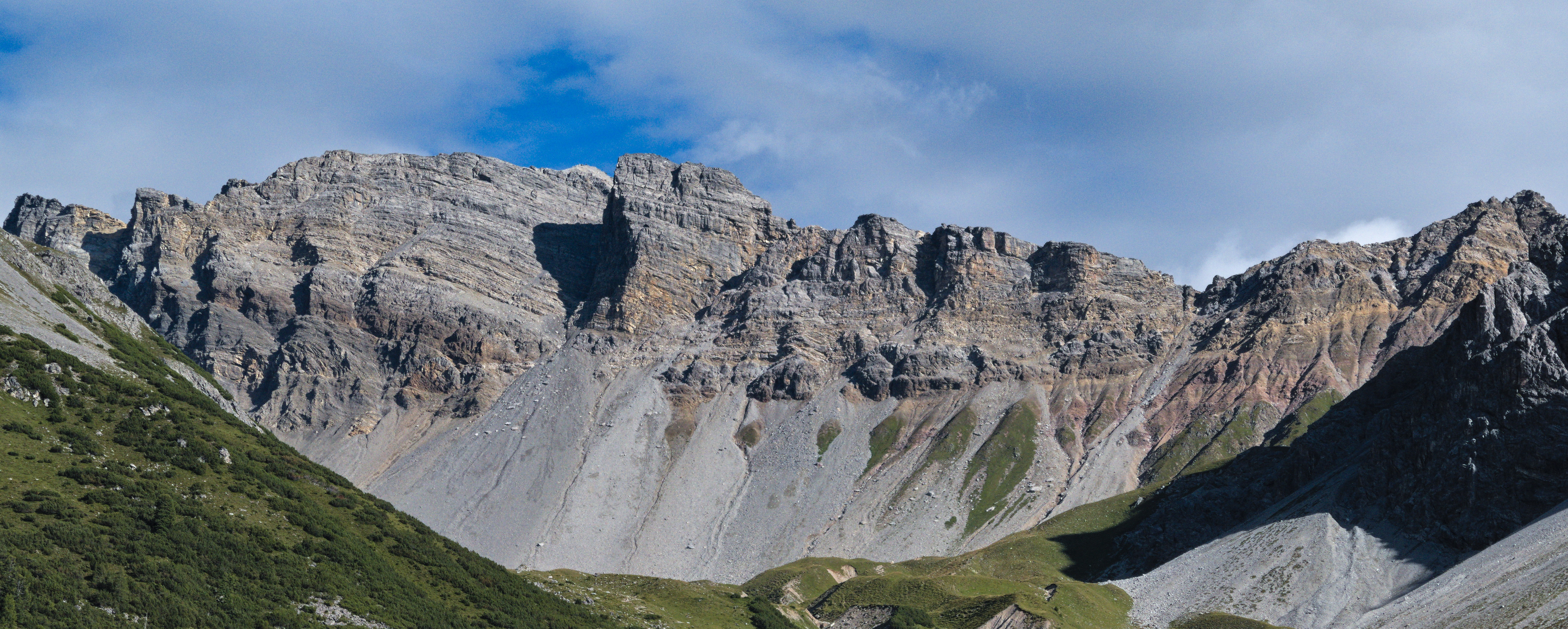
Amselflue. View from Arosa, Switzerland.

The Amselflue is a mountain of the Plessur Alps, overlooking Arosa in the canton of Graubünden. The main summit has an elevation of 2,781 metres, while the eastern summit, located directly above the Maienfelder Furgga, is 2,768 metre high.
