= Gürgaletsch =

Mountain in Switzerland

- Location within Switzerland

Highest point
- Elevation: 2,441 m (8,009 ft)
- Prominence: 144 m (472 ft)
- Parent peak: Aroser Rothorn
- Coordinates: 46°47′49.9″N 9°34′57.6″E

Geography
- Location: Graubünden, Switzerland
- Parent range: Plessur Alps

The Gürgaletsch is a mountain of the Plessur Alps, located between Churwalden and Tschiertschen in the Swiss canton of Graubünden.
