= Valbellahorn =

Mountain in Switzerland

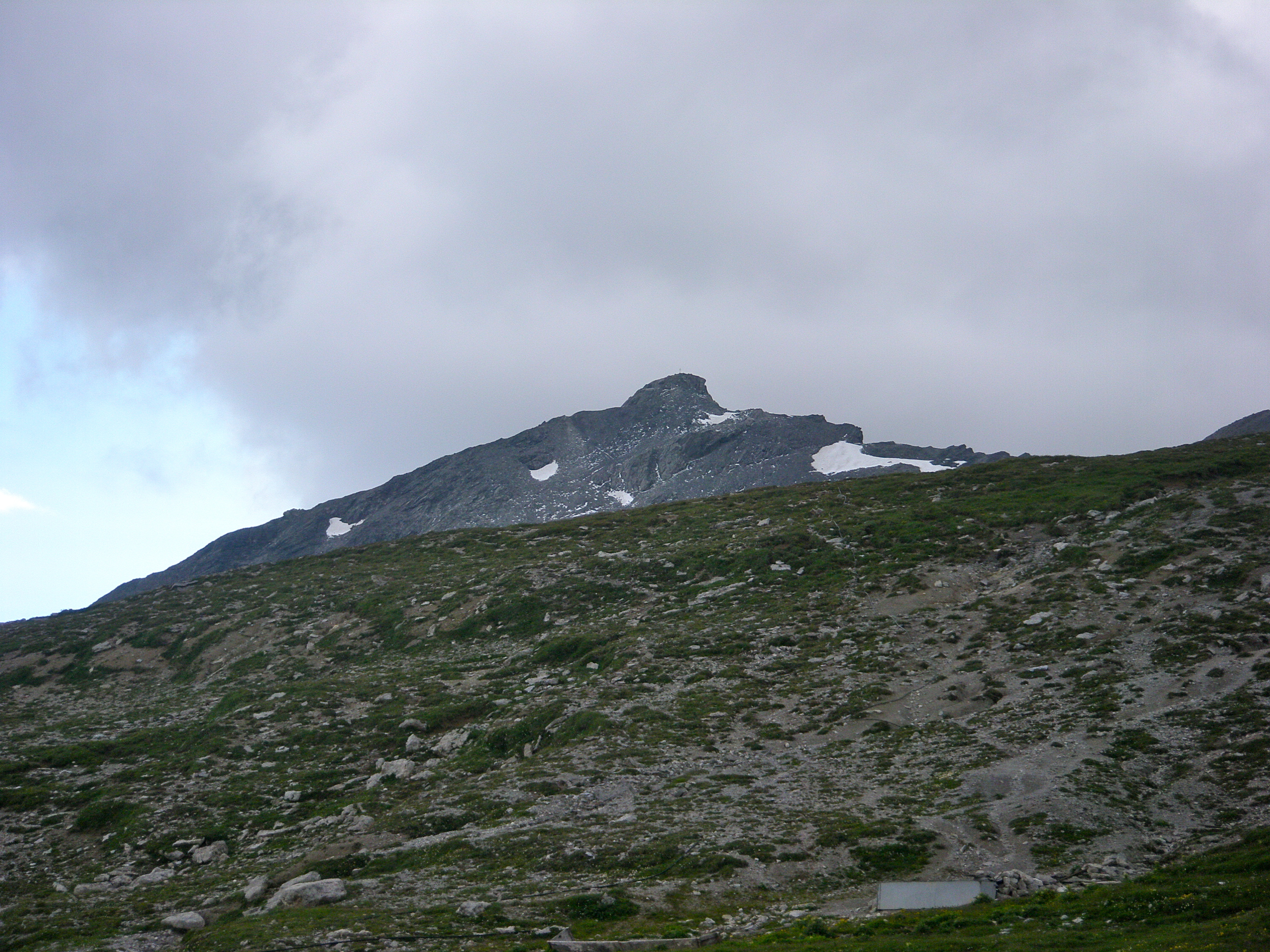

Highest point
- Elevation: 2,764 m (9,068 ft)
- Prominence: 209 m (686 ft)
- Parent peak: Aroser Rothorn
- Coordinates: 46°44′23.2″N 9°42′06.7″E

Geography
- Location within Switzerland
- Location: Graubünden, Switzerland
- Parent range: Plessur Alps

The Valbellahorn is a mountain of the Plessur Alps, located between Arosa and Wiesen in the canton of Graubünden.
