= Fulhorn =

Mountain in Switzerland

- Location within Switzerland

Highest point
- Elevation: 2,529 m (8,297 ft)
- Prominence: 128 m (420 ft)
- Parent peak: Stätzer Horn
- Coordinates: 46°46′26″N 9°29′38.4″E

Geography
- Location: Graubünden, Switzerland
- Parent range: Plessur Alps

The Fulhorn is a mountain of the Plessur Alps, overlooking Churwalden in the canton of Graubünden. It lies on the range separating the Domleschg from Lenzerheide.
