= Stelli =

Mountain in Switzerland

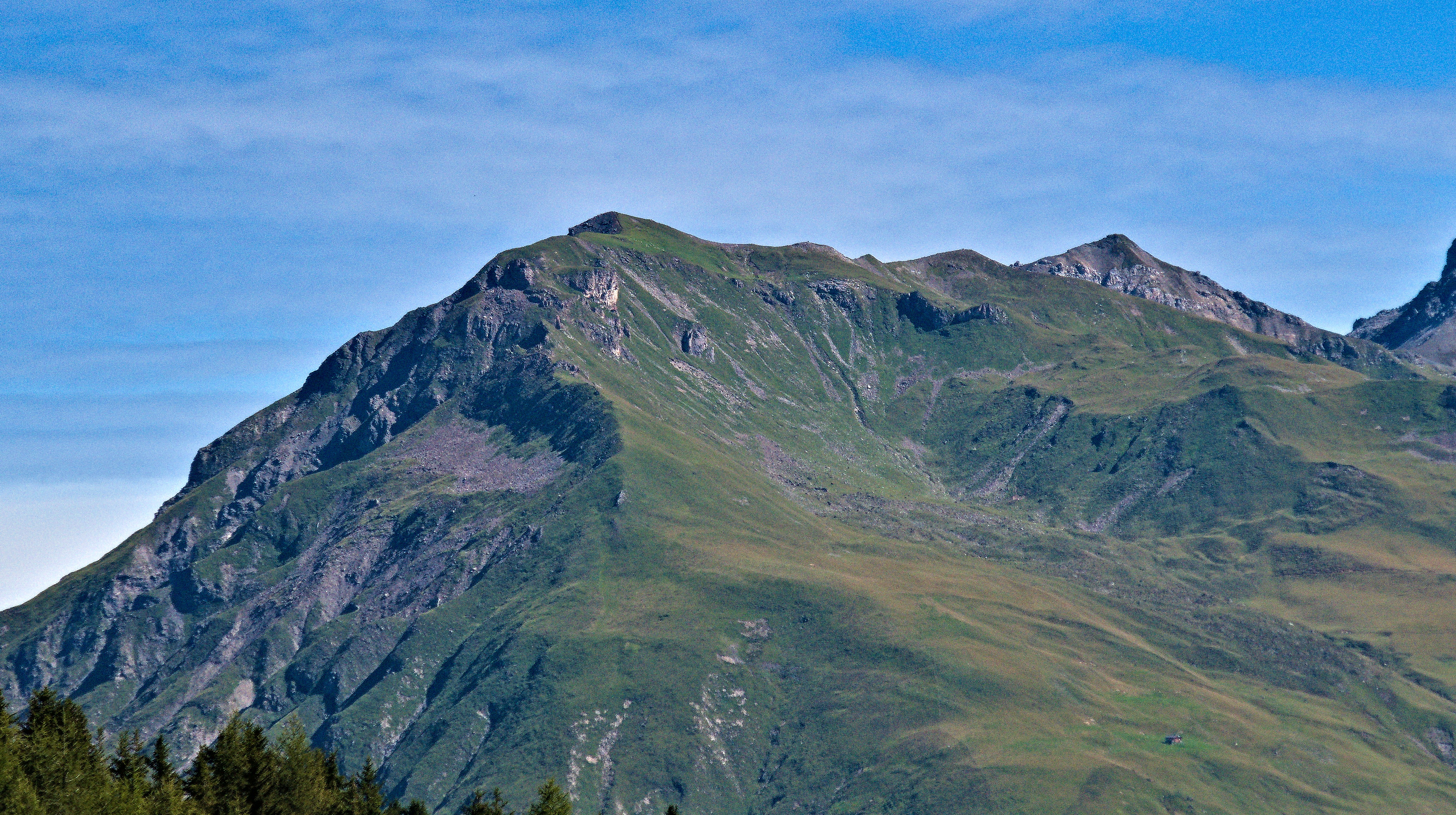

Highest point
- Elevation: 2,622 m (8,602 ft)
- Prominence: 101 m (331 ft)
- Parent peak: Weissfluh
- Coordinates: 46°50′09.9″N 9°45′56.3″E

Geography
- Location within Switzerland
- Location: Graubünden, Switzerland
- Parent range: Plessur Alps

The Stelli is a mountain of the Plessur Alps, overlooking Langwies in the canton of Graubünden. It lies west of the Weissfluh.
