= Glattwang =

Mountain in Switzerland

- Location within Switzerland

Highest point
- Elevation: 2,376 m (7,795 ft)
- Prominence: 54 m (177 ft)
- Parent peak: Hinteregg
- Coordinates: 46°52′52″N 9°42′51.9″E

Geography
- Location: Graubünden, Switzerland
- Parent range: Plessur Alps

The Glattwang is a mountain of the Plessur Alps, overlooking Fideris in the canton of Graubünden.
