= Lenzerhorn =

Mountain in Switzerland

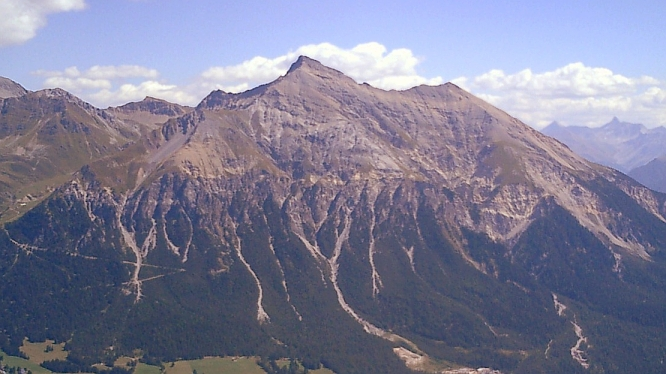

Highest point
- Elevation: 2,906 m (9,534 ft)
- Prominence: 291 m (955 ft)
- Parent peak: Aroser Rothorn
- Coordinates: 46°42′32.2″N 9°35′40″E

Geography
- Location within Switzerland
- Location: Graubünden, Switzerland
- Parent range: Plessur Alps

The Lenzerhorn (also spelled Lenzer Horn) is a mountain of the Plessur Alps, located east of Lenzerheide in the canton of Graubünden. It has an elevation of 2,906 metres and is, after the Aroser Rothorn, the second highest peak of the Plessur Alps.
