= Strela =

Strela (Russian: Стрела, arrow) may refer to:

== Russian/Soviet technology ==
=== Anti-aircraft missiles ===
- 9K31 Strela-1, a.k.a. SA-9 Gaskin
- 9K32 Strela-2, a.k.a. SA-7 Grail
- 9K34 Strela-3, a.k.a. SA-14 Gremlin
- 9K35 Strela-10, a.k.a. SA-13 Gopher
- KSShch, a Soviet anti-ship cruise missile with a nuclear warhead. Sometimes referred to as P-1 Strela

=== Other ===
- Strela (crane), a class of Russian-built cargo cranes used on the Mir and the International Space Station
- Strela (rocket), a Soviet/Russian carrier rocket
- Strela (satellite), a Russian communications satellite constellation
- Strela computer, the first mainframe computer manufactured serially in the Soviet Union

== Places ==
- Strela (mountain), in Switzerland
- Střela, a river in the Czech Republic
- Klikawa (river), also called Střela, a river in Poland and the Czech Republic

== Other uses ==
- Strela (beer), a Cape Verdean beer
- Strela candy, a confectionery in the Commonwealth of Independent States

== See also ==
- Strzała (disambiguation)
