= Weissfluhjoch =

Mountain in Switzerland

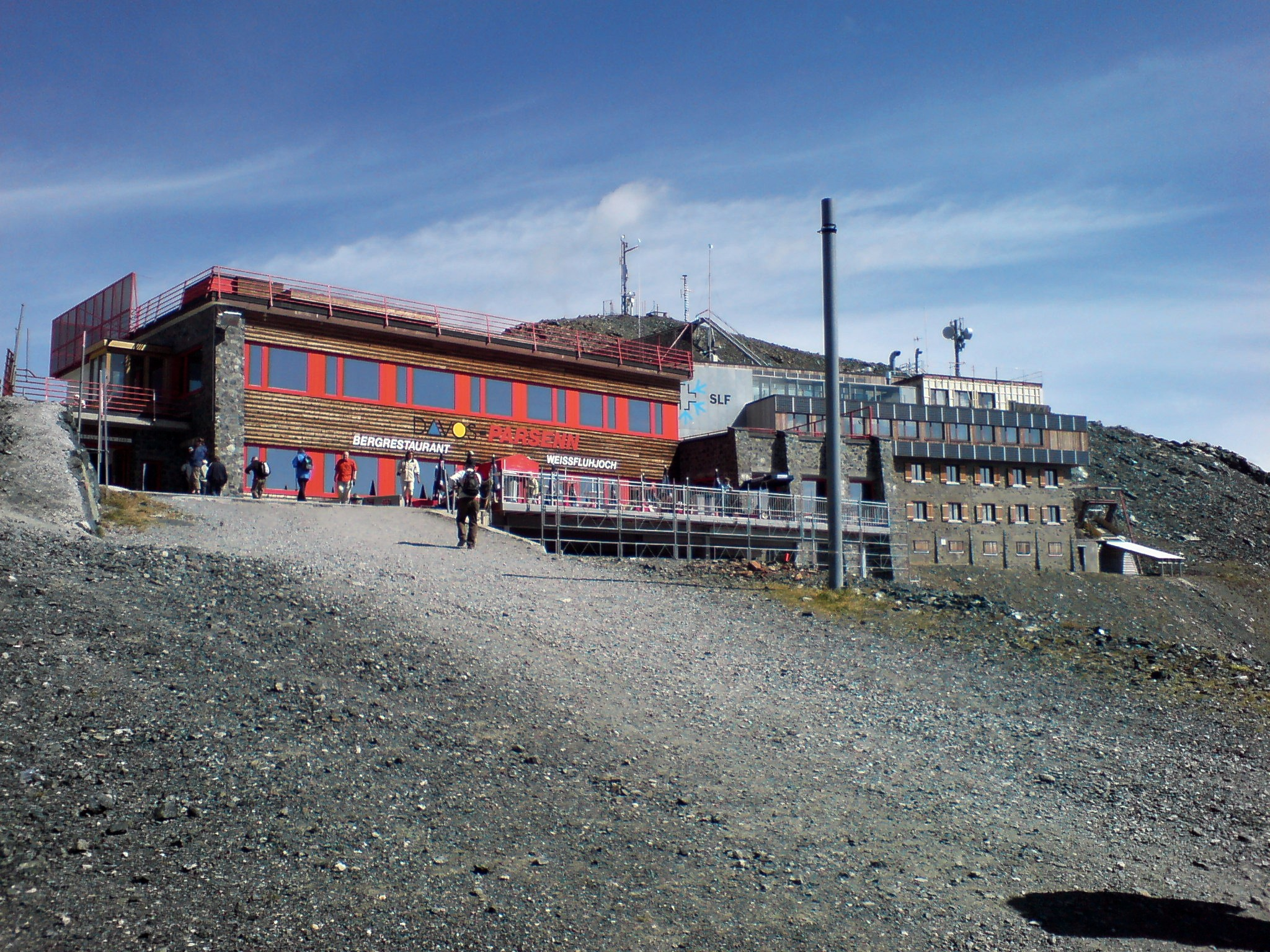
- The Weissflujoch

Highest point
- Elevation: 2,693 m (8,835 ft)
- Prominence: 64 m (210 ft)
- Parent peak: Weissfluh
- Coordinates: 46°50′00″N 09°48′23″E

Geography
- Location within Switzerland
- Location: Graubünden, Switzerland
- Parent range: Plessur Alps

Climbing
- Easiest route: Funicular

The Weissfluhjoch (2,693 m (8,835 ft)) is a summit southeast of the Weissfluh (2,843 m (9,327 ft)) situated in the Plessur Range in Graubünden, Switzerland. Since 1932, a funicular railway (the Parsennbahn) leads to its summit from Davos.

On the Weissflujoch, there used to be several laboratories of the Institute for Snow and Avalanche Research, a division of the Swiss Federal Institute for Forest, Snow and Landscape Research (WSL). However, while there is still a test site at the location, the institute building was sold to Davos Klosters Bergbahnen Ltd in 2019.

== Climate ==
Climate data for Weissfluhjoch, elevation 2,691 m (8,829 ft), (1991–2020)
Month	Jan	Feb	Mar	Apr	May	Jun	Jul	Aug	Sep	Oct	Nov	Dec	Year
Mean daily maximum °C (°F)	−5.3 (22.5)	−5.9 (21.4)	−4.1 (24.6)	−1.5 (29.3)	2.7 (36.9)	7.3 (45.1)	10.2 (50.4)	10.6 (51.1)	6.5 (43.7)	3.4 (38.1)	−1.7 (28.9)	−4.3 (24.3)	1.5 (34.7)
Daily mean °C (°F)	−7.8 (18.0)	−8.5 (16.7)	−6.6 (20.1)	−4.0 (24.8)	0.1 (32.2)	3.9 (39.0)	6.2 (43.2)	6.6 (43.9)	3.0 (37.4)	0.3 (32.5)	−4.2 (24.4)	−6.9 (19.6)	−1.5 (29.3)
Mean daily minimum °C (°F)	−10.4 (13.3)	−11.2 (11.8)	−9.3 (15.3)	−6.5 (20.3)	−2.3 (27.9)	1.3 (34.3)	3.2 (37.8)	3.7 (38.7)	0.5 (32.9)	−2.2 (28.0)	−6.7 (19.9)	−9.6 (14.7)	−4.1 (24.6)
Average precipitation mm (inches)	107.8 (4.24)	80.2 (3.16)	95.8 (3.77)	79.3 (3.12)	116.2 (4.57)	165.5 (6.52)	181.0 (7.13)	197.5 (7.78)	122.7 (4.83)	97.3 (3.83)	92.1 (3.63)	103.4 (4.07)	1,438.8 (56.65)
Average snowfall cm (inches)	131.2 (51.7)	116.5 (45.9)	123.0 (48.4)	91.1 (35.9)	63.0 (24.8)	35.9 (14.1)	13.7 (5.4)	11.6 (4.6)	35.1 (13.8)	64.1 (25.2)	117.9 (46.4)	136.4 (53.7)	939.5 (369.9)
Average precipitation days (≥ 1.0 mm)	10.5	9.6	12.0	11.6	14.2	15.4	15.2	15.0	12.1	10.0	10.9	11.0	147.5
Average snowy days (≥ 1.0 cm)	12.9	11.8	14.3	12.7	10.2	5.5	2.5	2.0	5.8	8.1	12.9	14.3	113.0
Average relative humidity (%)	64	66	72	77	81	82	80	79	78	71	70	66	74
Mean monthly sunshine hours	141.8	145.0	166.8	163.4	167.7	167.9	185.7	181.2	161.1	165.0	127.8	120.9	1,894.3
Percentage possible sunshine	52	51	48	43	39	38	42	45	46	51	46	47	45
Source 1: NOAA
Source 2: MeteoSwiss

== See also ==
- List of mountains of Switzerland accessible by public transport
