= Guggernell =

Mountain in Switzerland

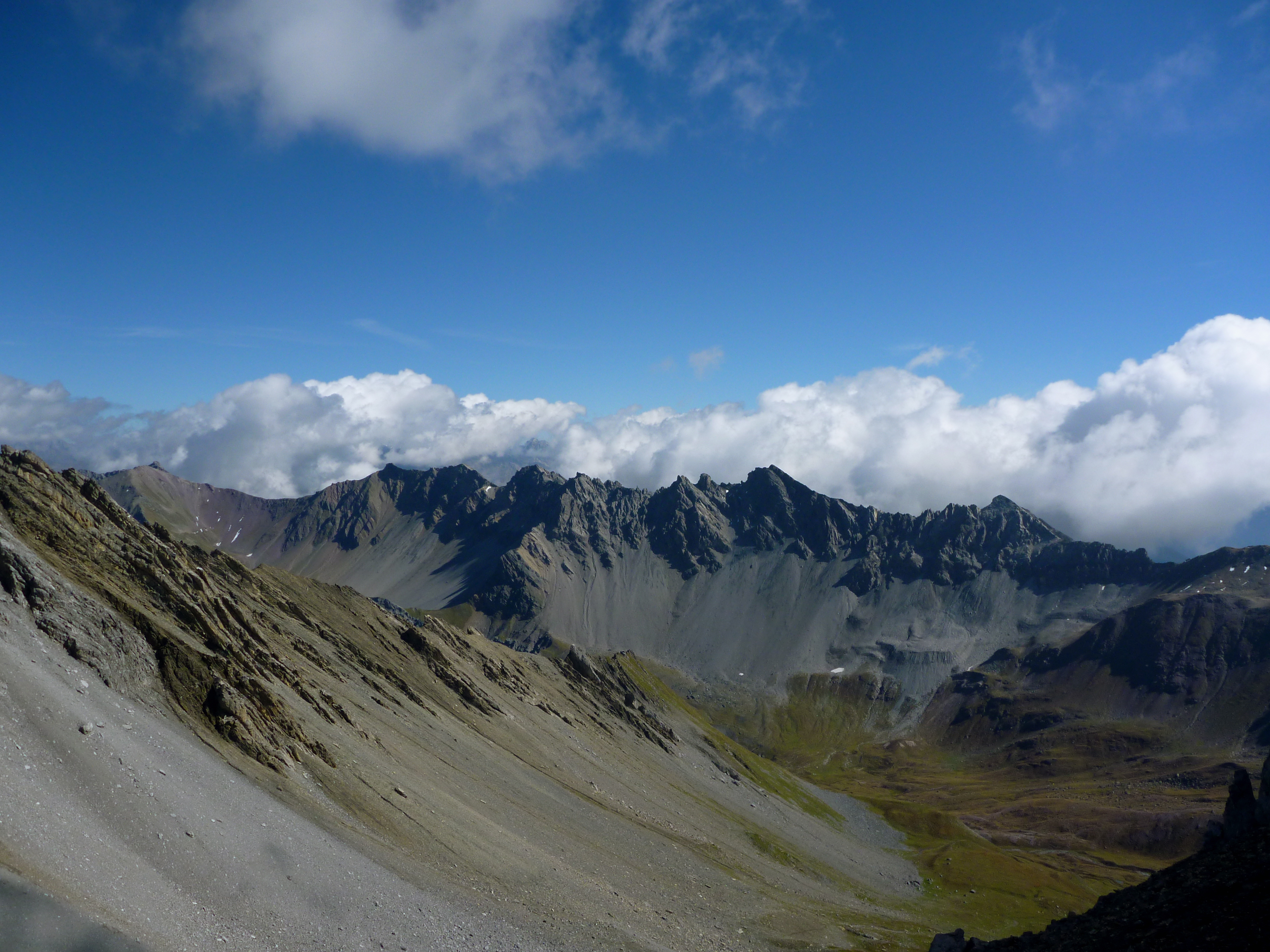
- The Guggernellgrat (centre-right) and the Guggernell (right)

Highest point
- Elevation: 2,744 m (9,003 ft)
- Prominence: 64 m (210 ft)
- Parent peak: Guggernellgrat
- Coordinates: 46°43′20.8″N 9°39′12.4″E

Geography
- Location within Switzerland
- Location: Graubünden, Switzerland
- Parent range: Plessur Range

The Guggernell is a mountain of the Plessur Alps, located south of Arosa in the canton of Graubünden. It lies west of the Guggernellgrat.
