= Chistenstein =

Mountain in Switzerland

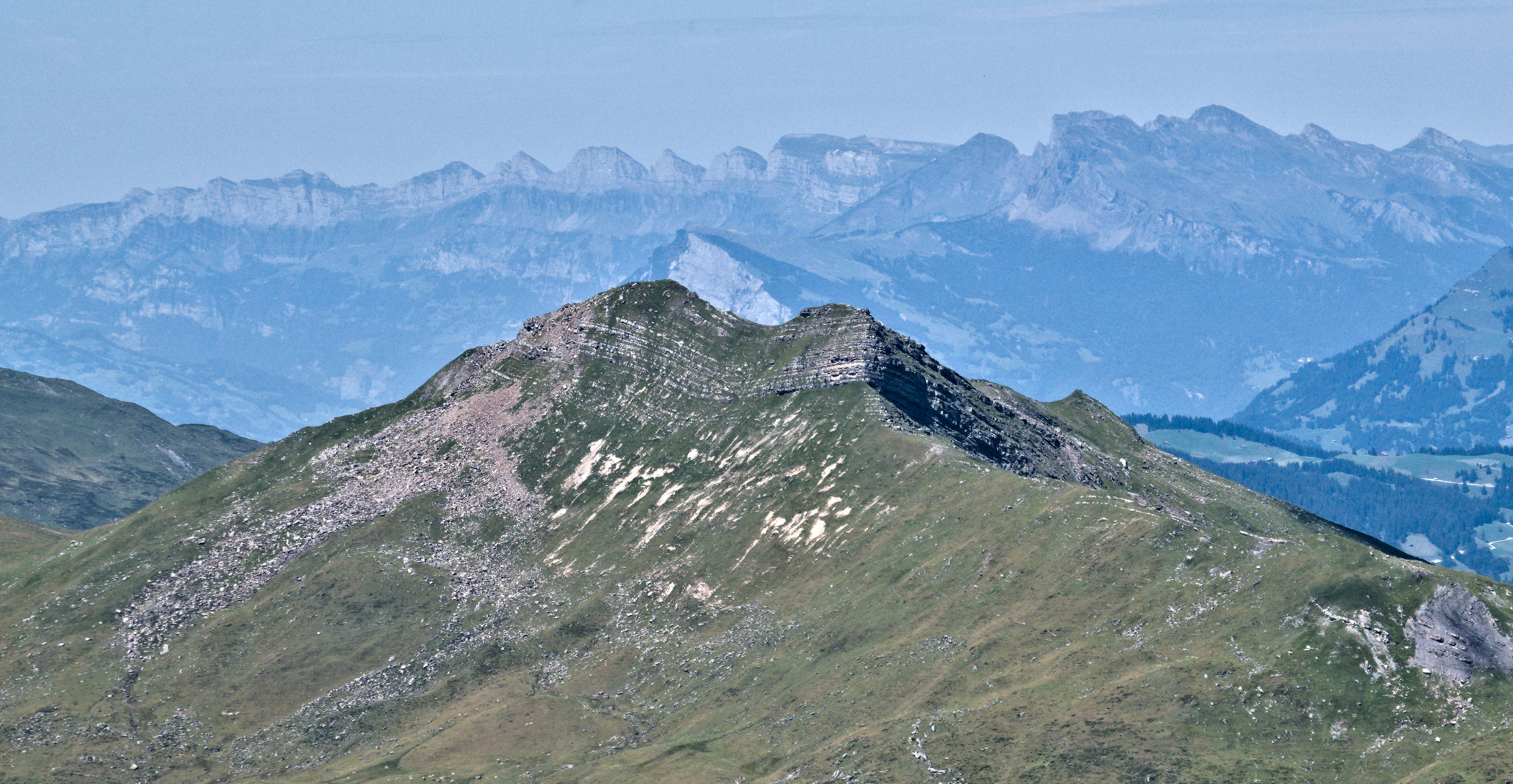

Highest point
- Elevation: 2,473 m (8,114 ft)
- Prominence: 267 m (876 ft)
- Parent peak: Hochwang
- Coordinates: 46°51′58.1″N 9°46′00.7″E

Geography
- Location within Switzerland
- Location: Graubünden, Switzerland
- Parent range: Plessur Alps

The Chistenstein (2,473 m) is a mountain of the Plessur Alps, overlooking Küblis in the Swiss canton of Graubünden. It lies just west of the Durannapass (2,117 m).
