= Weissfluh =

Mountain in Switzerland

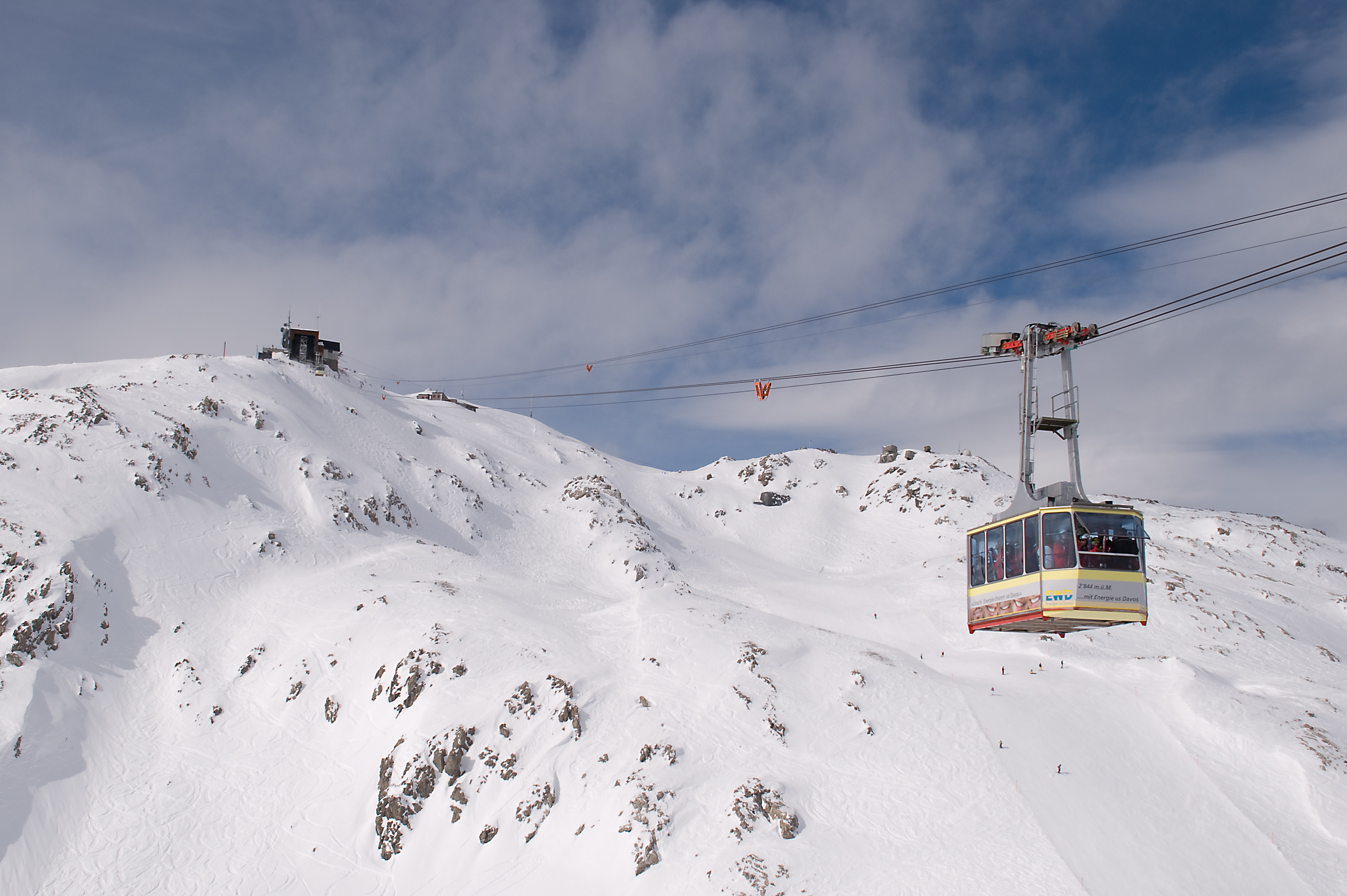
- Aerial tramway from Weissfluhjoch to Weissfluh

Highest point
- Elevation: 2,843 m (9,327 ft)
- Prominence: 497 m (1,631 ft)
- Parent peak: Aroser Rothorn
- Isolation: 11.5 km (7.1 mi)
- Listing: Alpine mountains 2500-2999 m
- Coordinates: 46°50′6.6″N 9°47′39.8″E

Geography
- Location within Switzerland
- Location: Graubünden, Switzerland
- Parent range: Plessur Alps

Climbing
- Easiest route: Aerial tramway

The Weissfluh is a mountain of the Plessur Alps, located above Davos in the canton of Graubünden. It is part of a ski area and the summit is served by a cable car from the Weissfluhjoch.

== See also ==
- List of most isolated mountains of Switzerland
- List of mountains of Switzerland accessible by public transport
