= Parpaner Rothorn =

Mountain in Switzerland

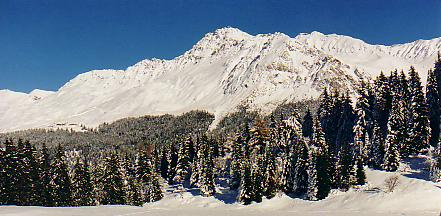
- View from Lenzerheide

Highest point
- Elevation: 2,899 m (9,511 ft)
- Prominence: 77 m (253 ft)
- Parent peak: Aroser Rothorn
- Coordinates: 46°44′35″N 9°36′13″E

Geography
- Location within Switzerland
- Location: Graubünden, Switzerland
- Parent range: Plessur Alps

The Parpaner Rothorn is a mountain of the Plessur Alps, overlooking Parpan in the canton of Graubünden. The summit is easily accessible with a cable car from Lenzerheide, the upper station being located 30 metres below the main summit.

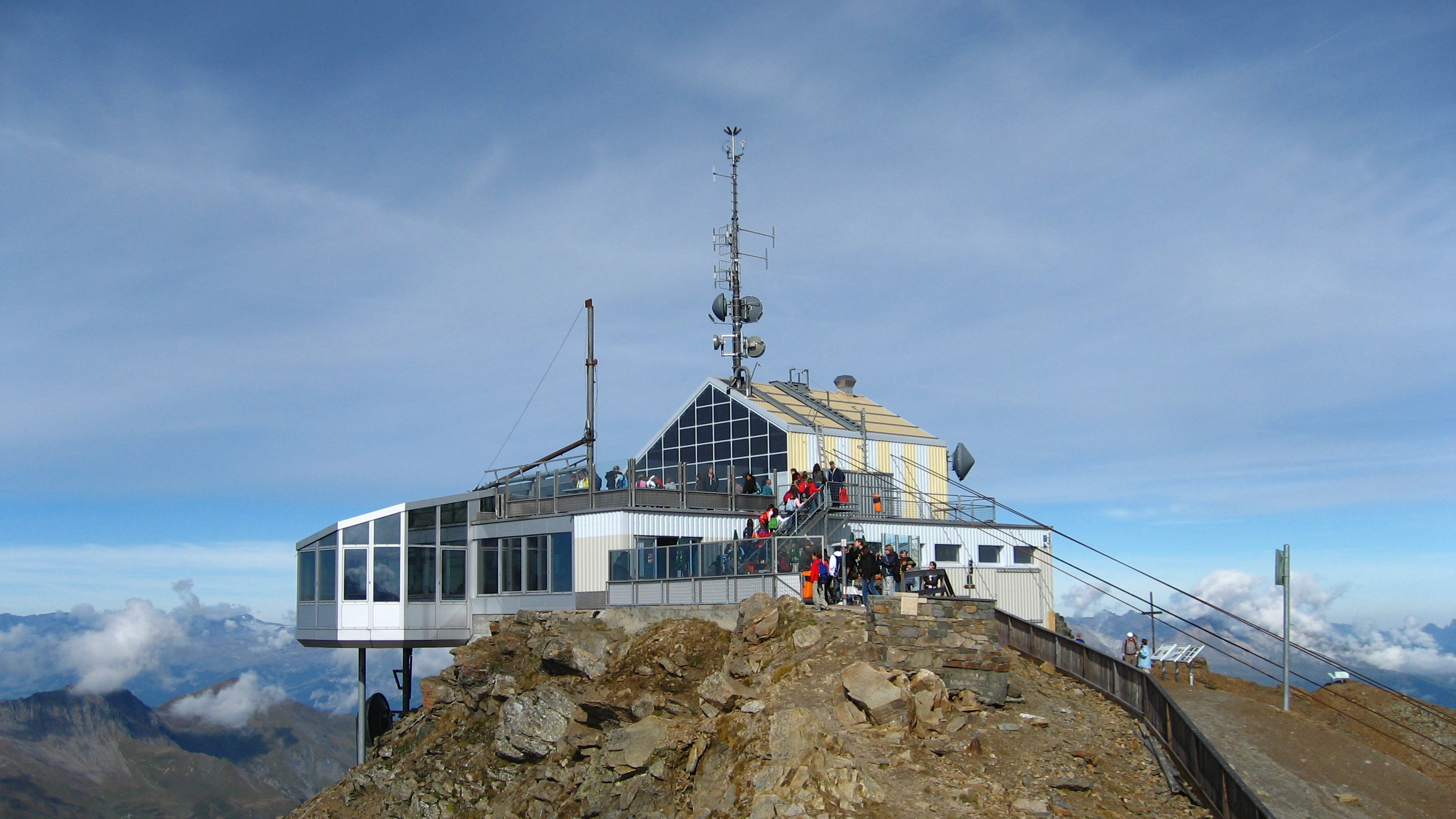
The cable car station on the lower summit

== See also ==
- List of mountains of Switzerland accessible by public transport
