= Guggernellgrat =

Mountain in Switzerland

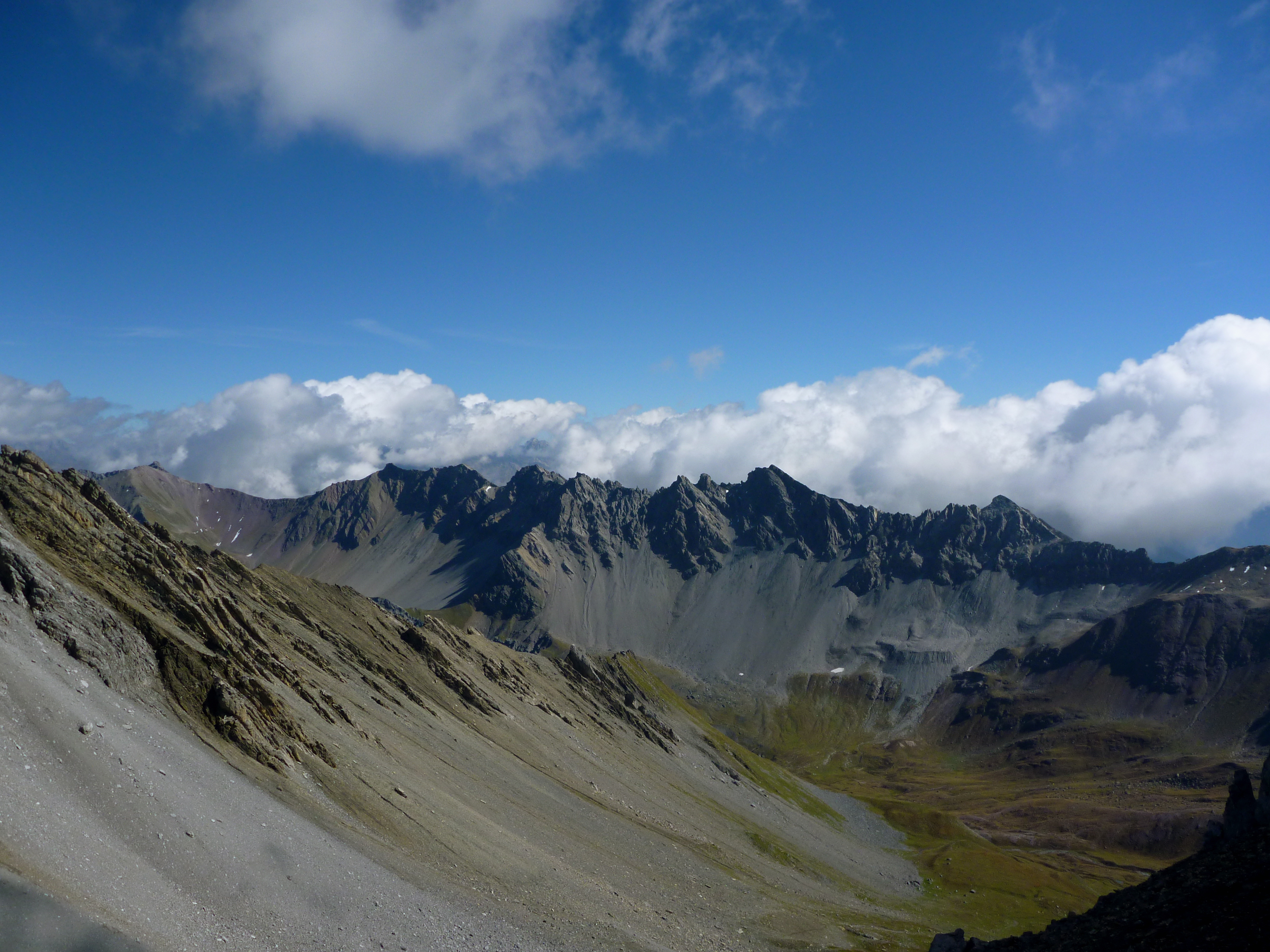
- West side (summit is on the centre-right)

Highest point
- Elevation: 2,810 m (9,220 ft)
- Prominence: 237 m (778 ft)
- Parent peak: Aroser Rothorn
- Coordinates: 46°43′32″N 9°39′37″E

Geography
- Location within Switzerland
- Location: Graubünden, Switzerland
- Parent range: Plessur Alps

The Guggernellgrat is a mountain of the Plessur Alps, located south of Arosa in the canton of Graubünden.
