= Hochwang =

Mountain in Switzerland

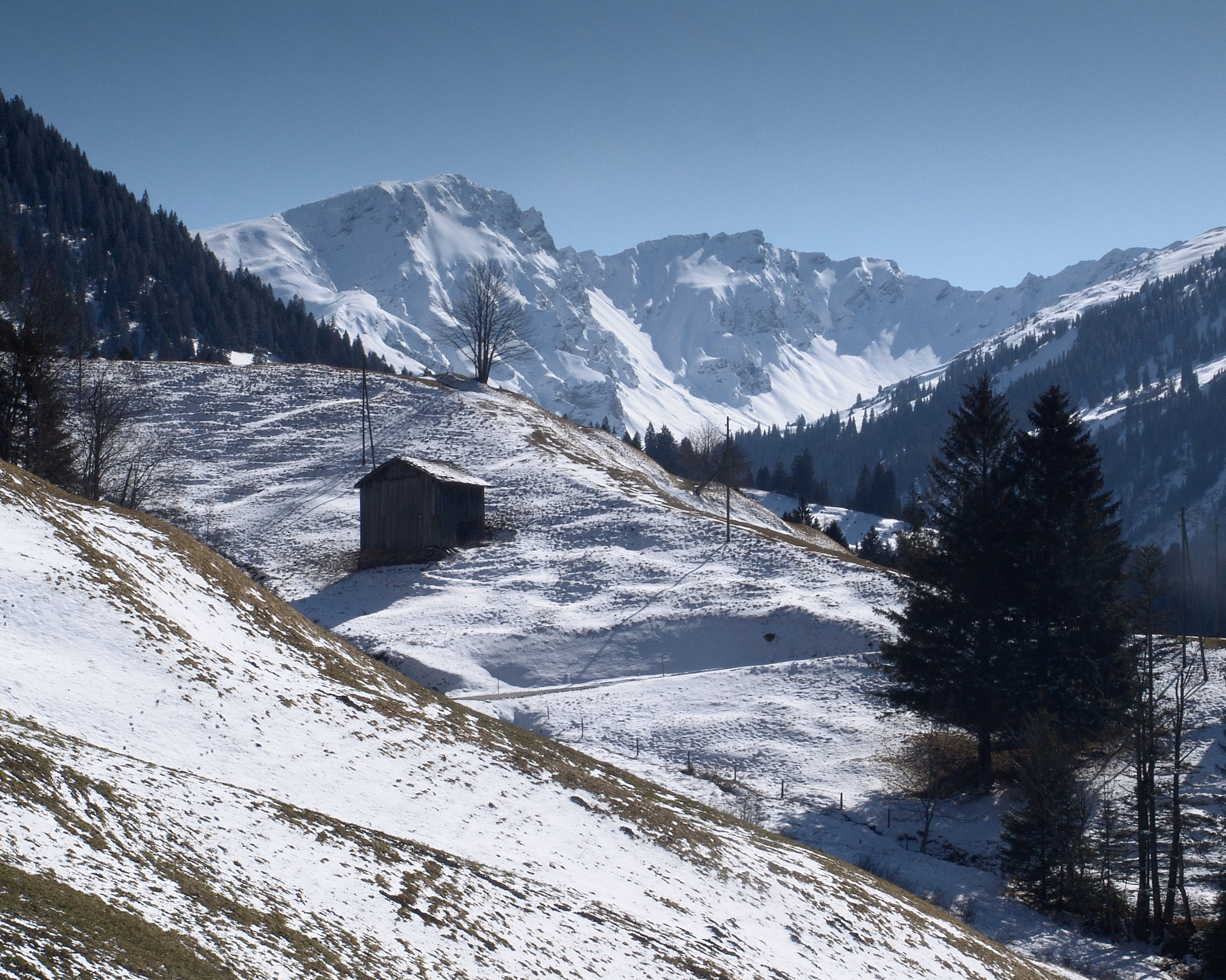
- View from Valzeina (north side)

Highest point
- Elevation: 2,534 m (8,314 ft)
- Prominence: 417 m (1,368 ft)
- Parent peak: Aroser Rothorn
- Listing: Alpine mountains 2500-2999 m
- Coordinates: 46°52′27.1″N 9°37′58.3″E

Geography
- Location within Switzerland
- Location: Graubünden, Switzerland
- Parent range: Plessur Alps

The Hochwang is a mountain of the Plessur Alps, located between the valleys of Schanfigg and Prättigau in the canton of Graubünden. With a height of 2,534 metres above sea level, it is the highest summit of the chain lying west of Durannapass. Several trails lead to its summit. The closest locality is Castiel.
