= Stätzerhorn =

Mountain in Switzerland

- Piz Raschil
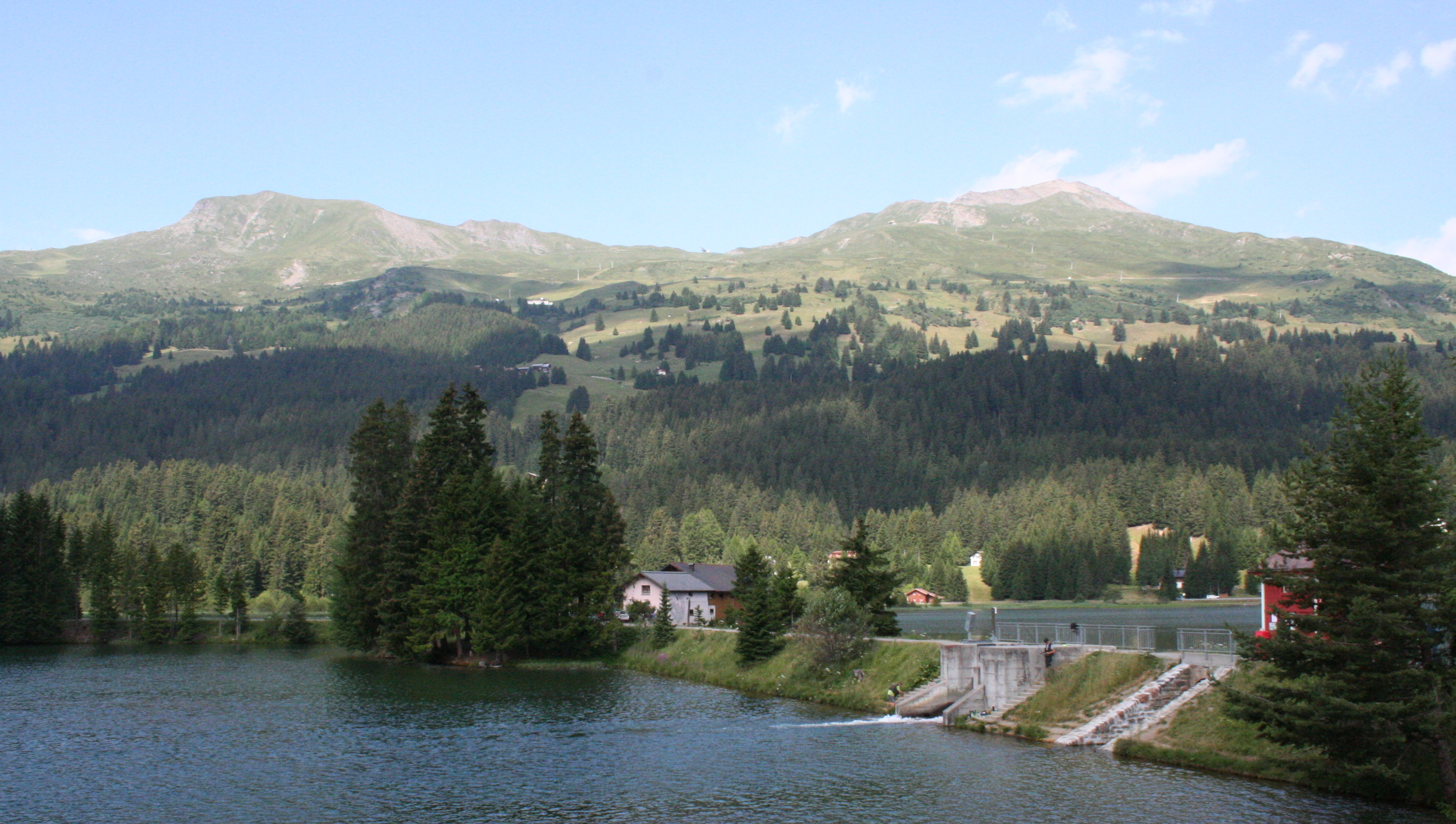
- Piz Danis (left) and Stätzer Horn (right) from Lenzerheide

Highest point
- Elevation: 2,575 m (8,448 ft)
- Prominence: 1,028 m (3,373 ft)
- Listing: Alpine mountains 2500-2999 m
- Coordinates: 46°45′48.6″N 9°30′28.9″E

Geography
- Location within Switzerland
- Location: Graubünden, Switzerland
- Parent range: Plessur Alps

The Stätzerhorn (also known as Piz Raschil) is a mountain of the Plessur Alps, overlooking Lenzerheide in the canton of Graubünden. With an elevation of 2,575 (8,445 ft) metres above sea level, the Stätzerhorn is the culminating point of the range that lies west of the Lenzerheide Pass. Several trails lead to the top from both sides of the mountain. In winter the Stätzerhorn is part of a ski area.
