= Plessur Alps =

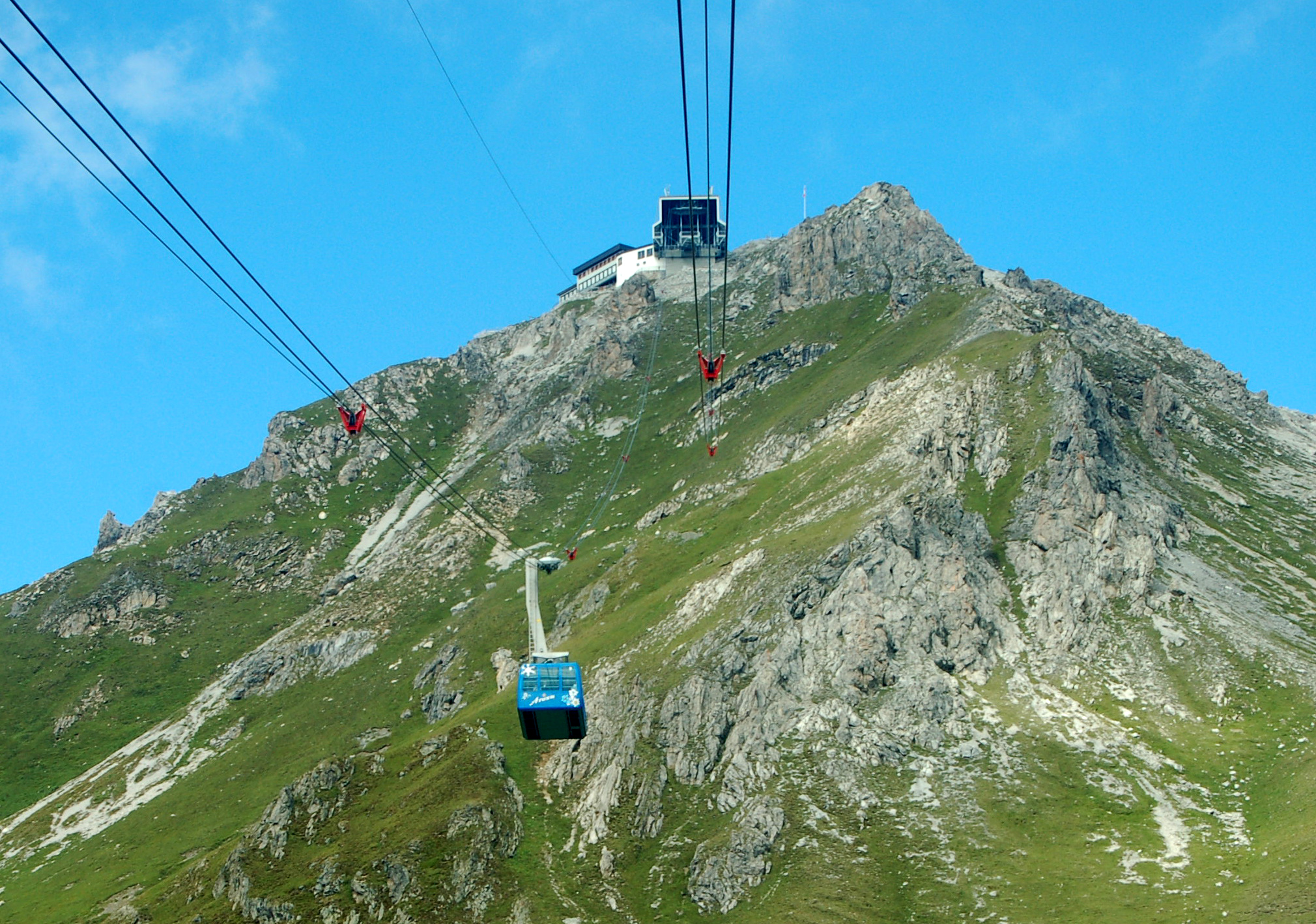
- Aroser Weisshorn (2,653m/8,704ft)

Highest point
- Peak: Aroser Rothorn
- Elevation: 2,980.2 m (9,778 ft)
- Coordinates: 46°44'16"N, 9°36'50"E

Naming
- Native name: Plessuralpen (German)

Geography
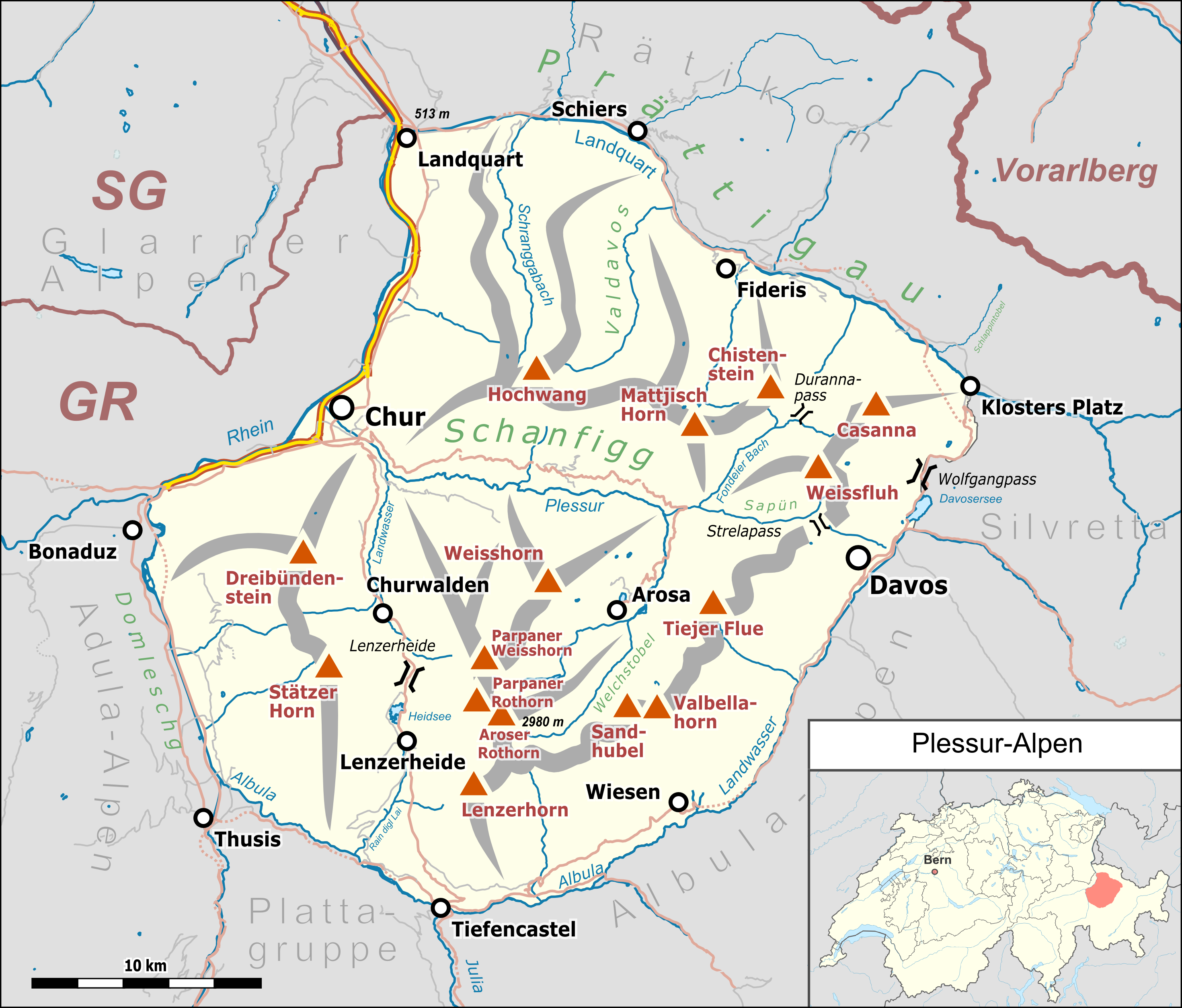
- Plessur Alps; The borders of the range according to Alpine Club classification of the Eastern Alps
- Country: Switzerland
- State: Graubünden
- Parent range: Western Rhaetian Alps
- Topo map: Swiss Federal Office of Topography swisstopo

The Plessur Alps are a mountain range in the Alps of eastern Switzerland and are considered to be part of the Western Rhaetian Alps. They are named after the river Plessur, which originates from the center of the ranges. The Plessur Alps are separated from the Glarus Alps in the west by the Rhine valley; from the Rätikon range in the north by the Landquart river valley (Prättigau); from the Albula Alps in the south-east by the Landwasser river valley; from the Oberhalbstein Alps in the south by the Albula river valley.

The Plessur Alps are drained by the rivers Rhine, Plessur, Landwasser and Landquart. The Arosa ski resort lies in the middle of the range.

Peaks of the Plessur Alps are the Aroser Rothorn (highest, 2,980 m (9,780 ft)) and Stätzerhorn (2,576 m (8,451 ft)).

The 2,377-metre (7,799 ft) Strela Pass is one of the major mountain passes in the range, and runs from Davos to Langwies.

== Peaks ==
The chief peaks of the Plessur Alps are listed below.

Mountain / Peak	Elevation		Prominence		Coordinates
Mountain / Peak	m	ft	m	ft	Coordinates
Aroser Rothorn	2,980	9,780	1,349	4,426	46°44′16″N 9°36′50″E
Lenzerhorn	2,906	9,534	291	955	46°42′32.51″N 9°35′42.29″E
Parpaner Rothorn	2,899	9,511	70	230	46°44′33″N 9°35′50″E
Amselflue	2,781	9,124	290	950	46°45′50″N 9°43′44″E
Sandhubel	2,764	9,068	117	384	46°44′24″N 9°41′5″E
Valbellahorn	2,764	9,068	209	686	46°44′23″N 9°42′7″E
Guggernell	2,744	9,003	64	210	46°43′21″N 9°39′12″E
Älpliseehorn	2,725	8,940	94	308	46°44′50″N 9°38′51″E
Schiahorn	2,709	8,888	113	371	46°49′4″N 9°48′14″E
Aroser Weisshorn	2,653	8,704	286	938	46°47′22″N 9°38′18″E
Strela	2,636	8,648	55	180	46°48′32″N 9°46′49″E
Stelli	2,622	8,602	101	331	46°50′10″N 9°45′56″E
Stätzerhorn	2,574	8,445	1,028	3,373	46°45′49″N 9°30′29″E
Casanna	2,557	8,389	122	400	46°51′33″N 9°49′35″E
Fulhorn	2,529	8,297	128	420	46°46′26″N 9°29′38″E
Mattjisch Horn	2,461	8,074	171	561	46°51′5″N 9°43′24″E
Gürgaletsch	2,441	8,009	144	472	46°47′49.9″N 9°34′57.4″E
Cunggel	2,413	7,917	124	407	46°51′57″N 9°40′14″E
Ful Berg	2,395	7,858	78	256	46°52′17″N 9°36′40″E
Glattwang	2,376	7,795	54	177	46°52′52″N 9°42′52″E

== Gallery ==
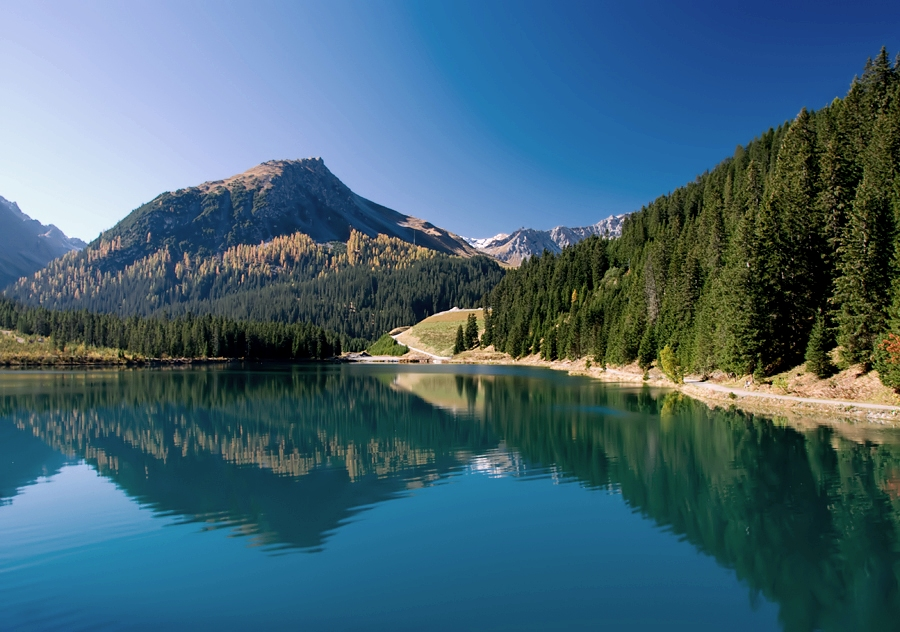
Lake near Arosa

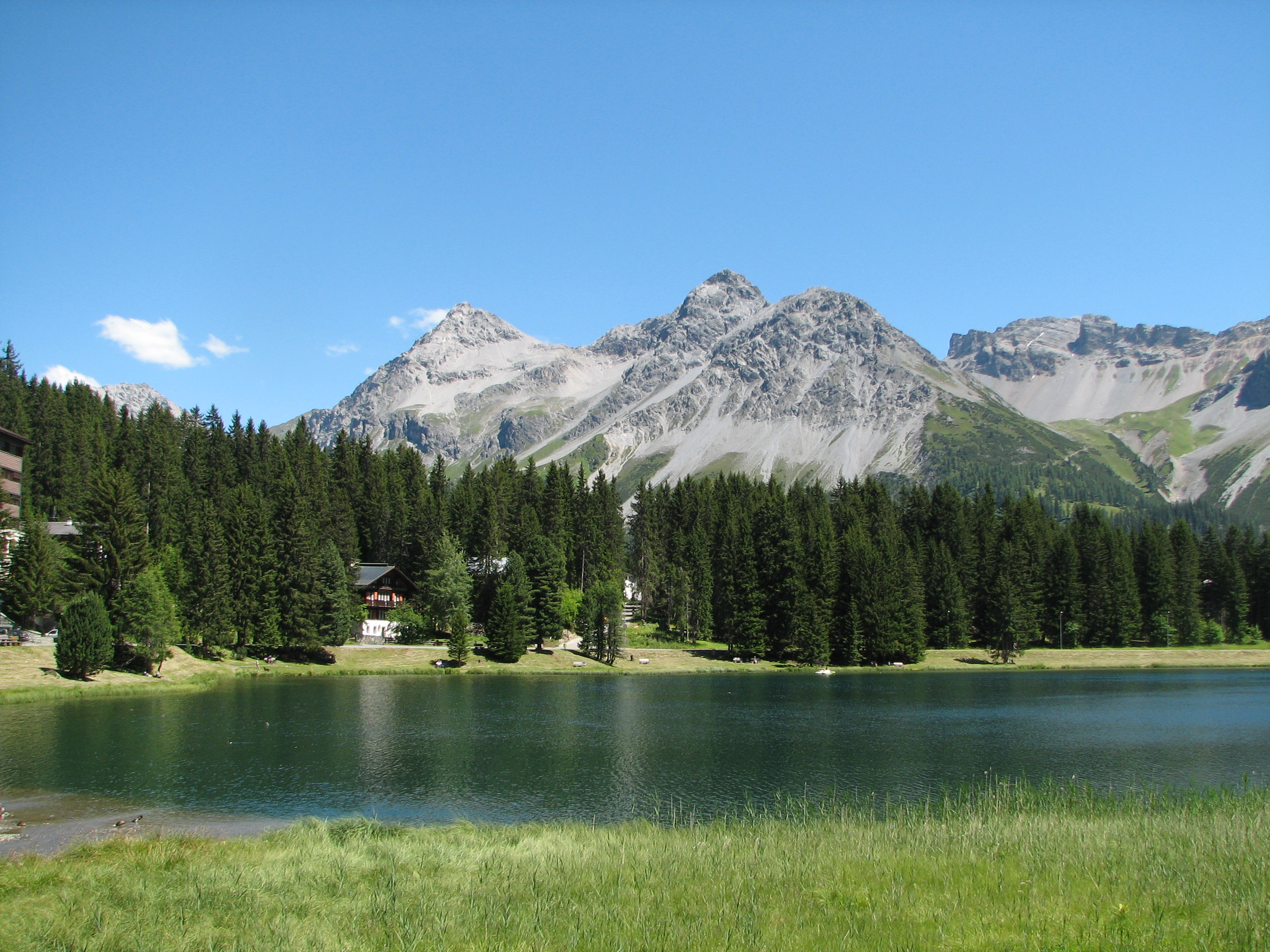
Obersee

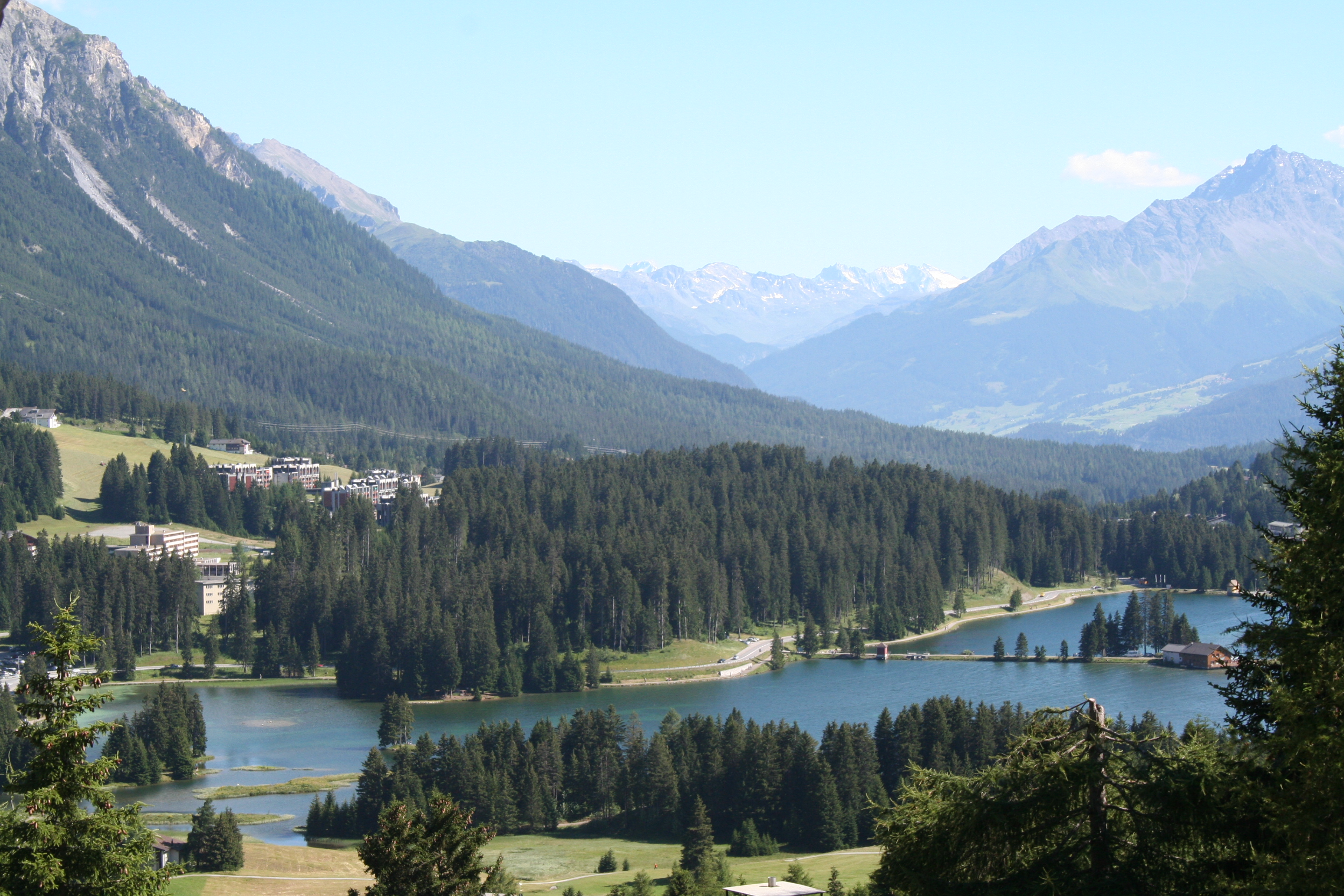
Valley of Lenzerheide

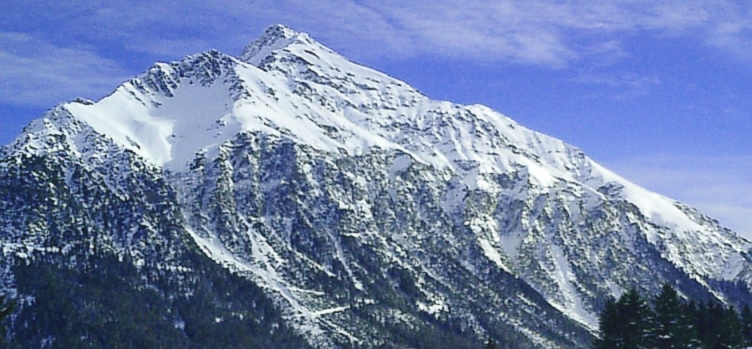
Lenzerhorn

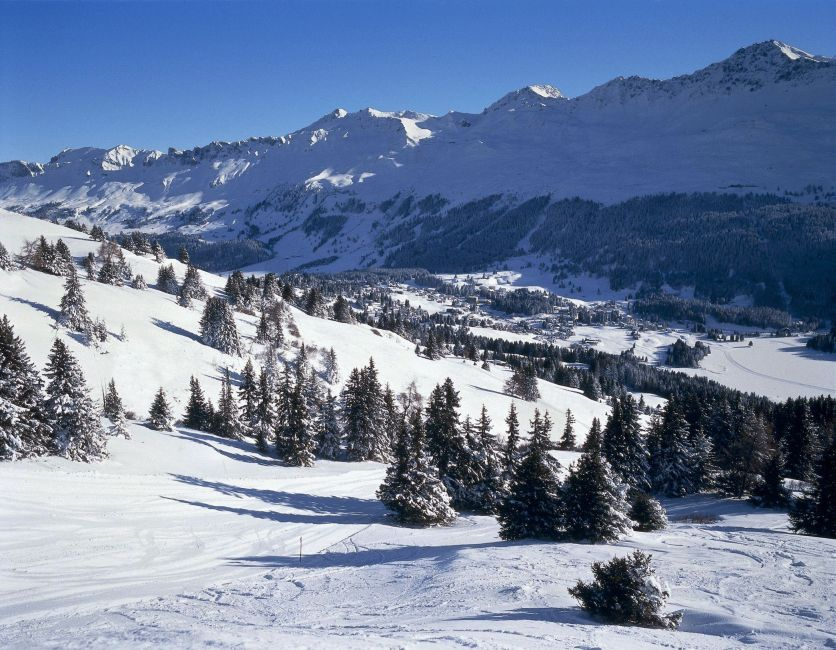
Parpaner Rothorn (right)

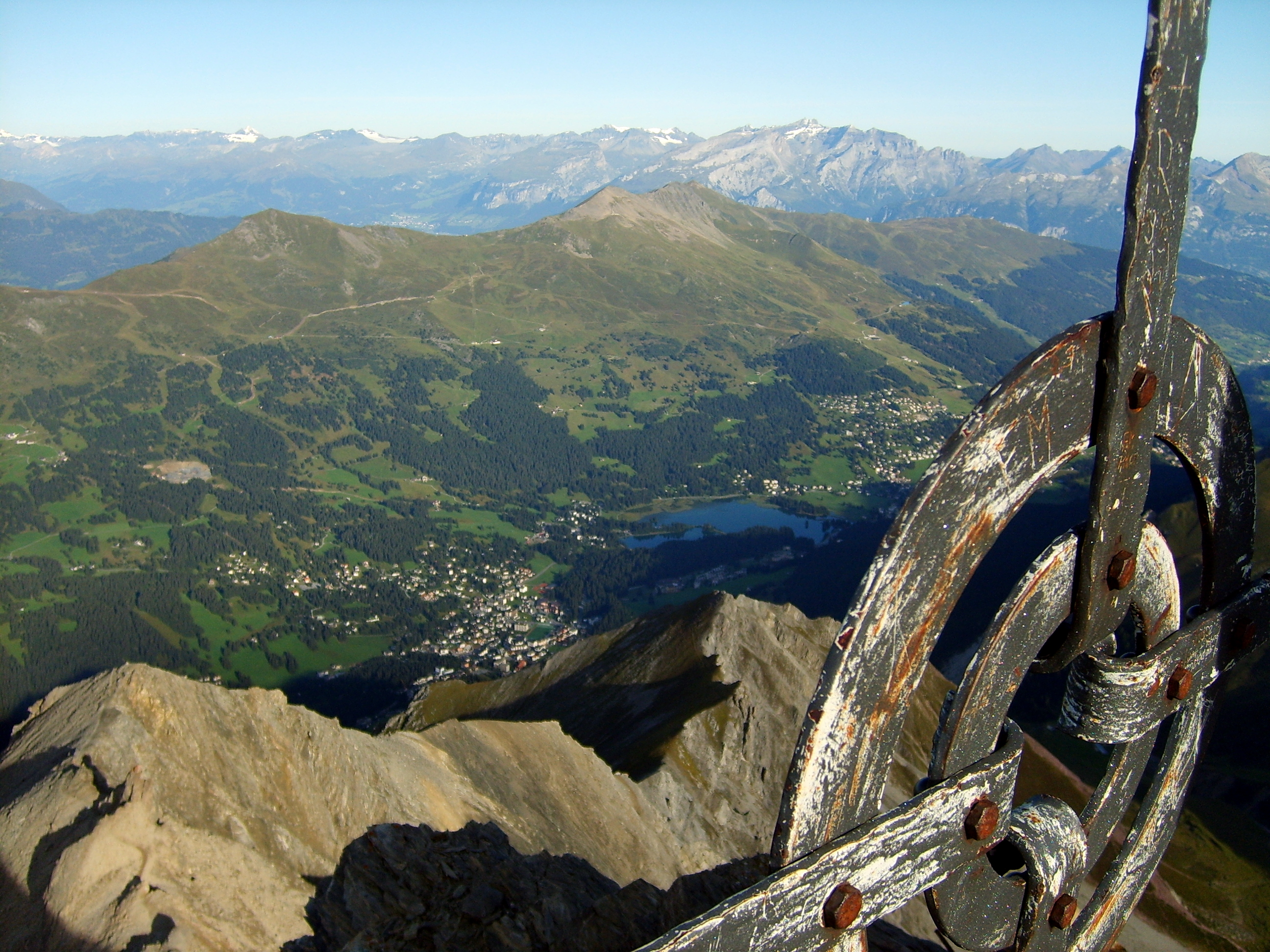
Summit of Lenzerhorn
