= Aroser Rothorn =

Mountain in Switzerland

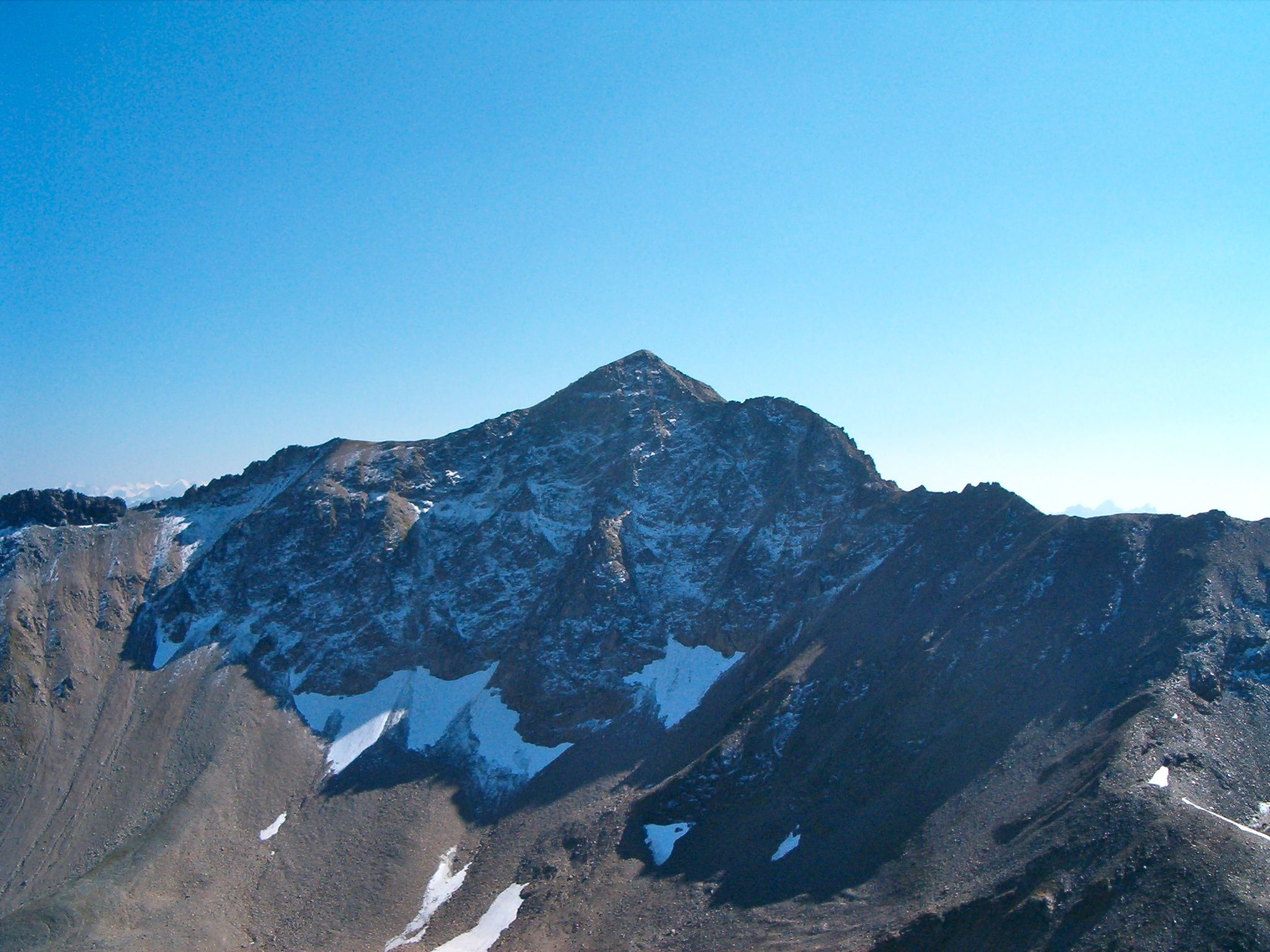
- Aroser Rothorn

Highest point
- Elevation: 2,980 m (9,780 ft)
- Prominence: 1,349 m (4,426 ft)
- Isolation: 13.5 km (8.4 mi)
- Coordinates: 46°44′16.4″N 09°36′50.3″E

Geography
- Location within Switzerland
- Location: Graubünden, Switzerland
- Parent range: Plessur Alps

The Aroser Rothorn is the highest mountain of the Plessur Alps. It is located between Arosa and Lenzerheide in the canton of Graubünden and with a summit elevation of 2,980 metres above sea level. The summit lies near the Parpaner Rothorn, which is served by a cable car.

== See also ==
- List of mountains of Graubünden
- List of most isolated mountains of Switzerland
