= Sengelmannstraße station =

Metro station in Hamburg, Germany

Sengelmannstraße (City Nord)
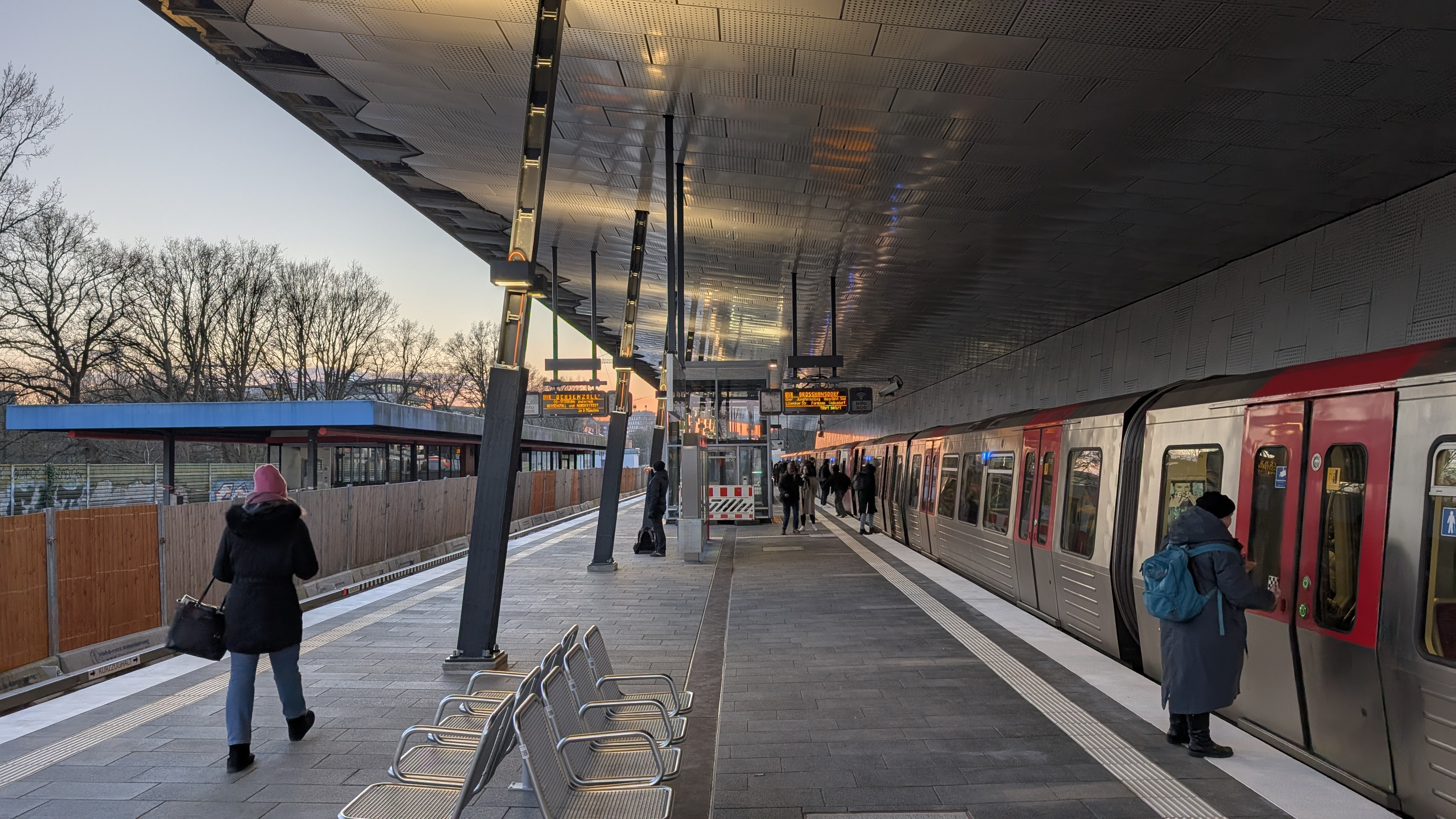

General information
- Location: Sengelmannstraße; 22297 Hamburg, Germany
- Coordinates: 53°36′34″N 10°01′19″E
- System: Hamburg U-Bahn
- Operator: Hamburger Hochbahn AG
- Line: U1
- Platforms: 2 island platforms, 1 unused
- Tracks: 4
- Connections: Bus

Construction
- Structure type: Elevated
- Cycle facilities: Bike+Ride facilities, bike rental
- Accessible: Yes

Other information
- Station code: HHA: SE
- Fare zone: HVV: A/103 & 105

History
- Opened: 26 September 1975
- Rebuilt: 17 February 2025 (partially)

Passengers
- 2019: 8,599/day

Services
Preceding station	Hamburg U-Bahn	Following station
Ohlsdorf towards Norderstedt Mitte	U1	Alsterdorf towards Großhansdorf or Ohlstedt
Location

Sengelmannstraße is a metro station on the Hamburg U-Bahn U1 line. The station was opened in September 1975 and is located in the Hamburg district of Alsterdorf, Germany. Alsterdorf is part of the borough of Hamburg-Nord.

== Location ==
The station is located to the north of City Nord, one of Hamburg's office districts, characterized by large office complexes and extensive green spaces. It lies adjacent to Sengelmannstraße, a major road running through the north of Hamburg that connects City Nord with Hamburg Airport.

== History ==
Sengelmannstraße station was opened on 26 September 1975 as an additional station between Alsterdorf and Ohlsdorf on the pre-existing line connecting Ohlsdorf and Kellinghusenstraße, which had opened in 1914 and had later become part of line U1.

The station was primarily constructed to provide access to City Nord, an office district under construction at the time. Due to original plans including the addition of another line between the Hamburg districts of Lurup and Winterhude, two island platforms with two tracks each were built. These expansion plans were ultimately abandoned in 1974 due to financial constraints and the loss of SPD's absolute majority in the 1974 state elections.

As part of construction works for the new U5 line, the station is undergoing extensive refurbishment. Between February 2023 and February 2025, the previously unused northern platform was reactivated for passenger service. Since then, all U1 trains have been using the northern platform, while the southern platform is being modernized in preparation for the future U5 line.

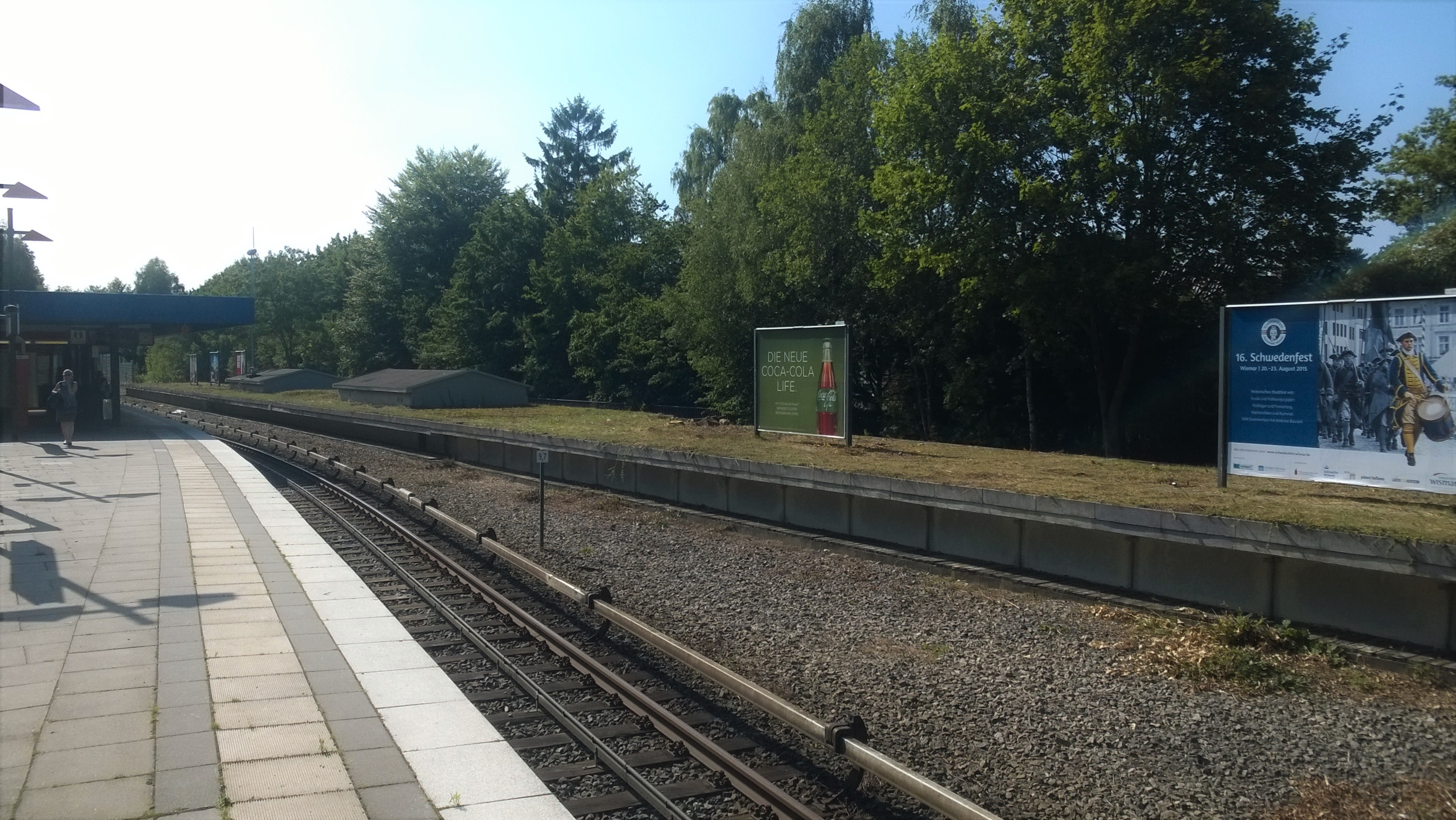
Northern platform prior to reactivation

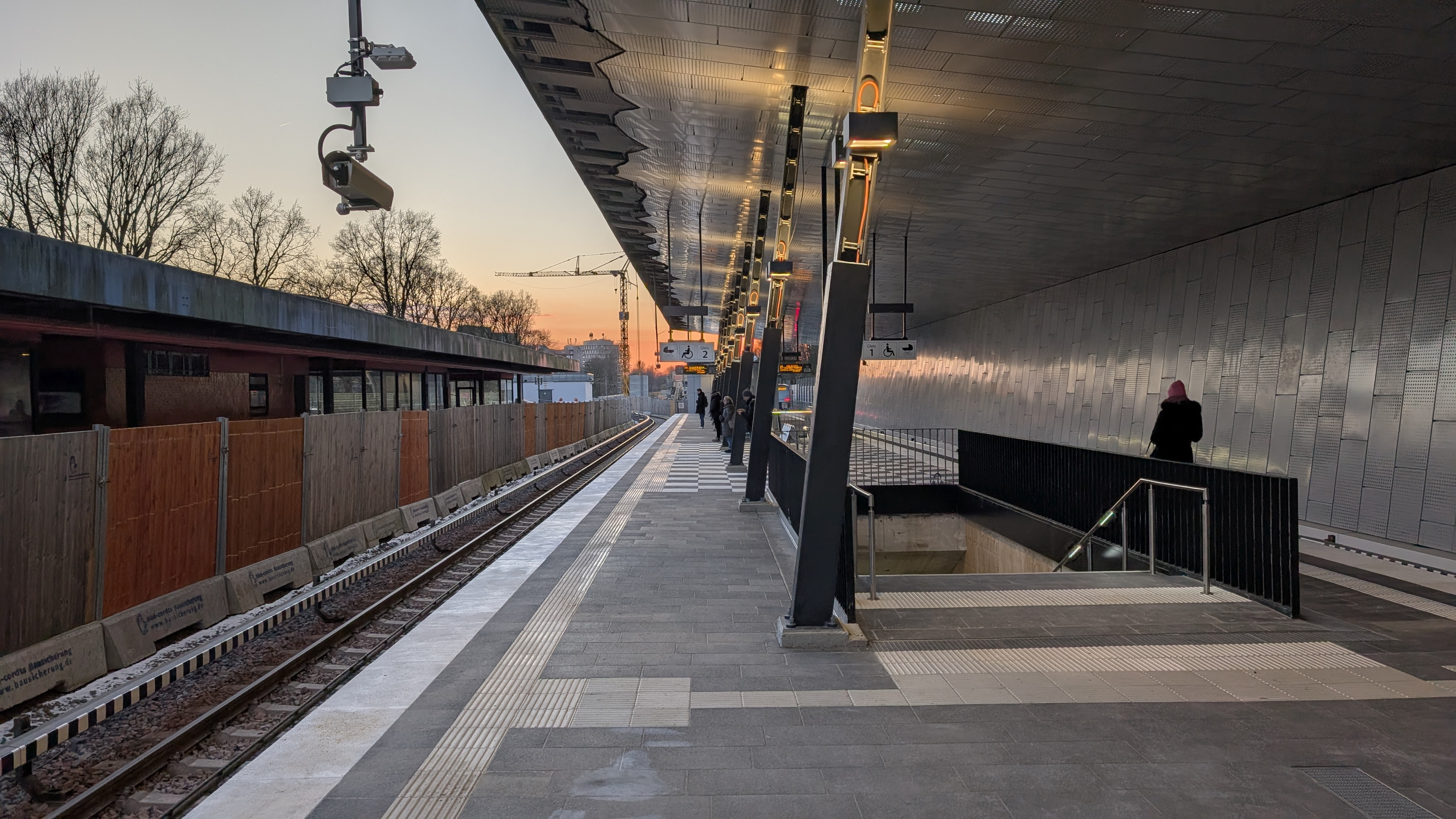
Northern platform after reactivation

== Services ==
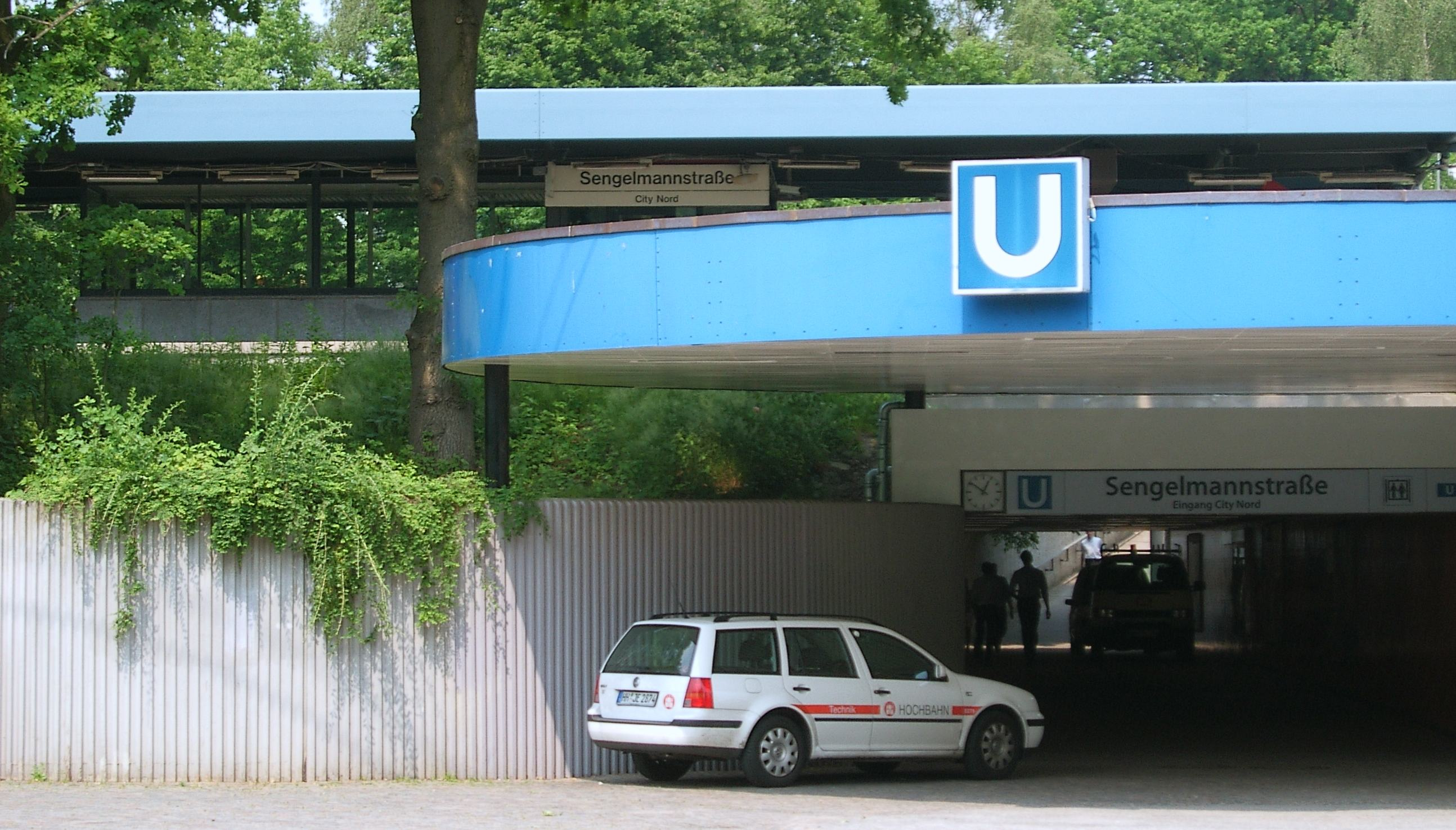
The station's entrance

Sengelmannstraße is served by Hamburg U-Bahn line U1. Trains generally run every 5 minutes, with some additional services being offered during peak times. On Saturday and Sunday nights, as well as on public holidays, night services run every 40 minutes. On weekdays, services rest between midnight and 4 a.m.

== Facilities ==
The station sits on an elevated structure and features two island platforms, only one of which is currently used. An underpass is located at the northern end of the platforms, connecting the platform with the exits. The station is unstaffed, but is equipped with ticket machines, CCTV surveillance and emergency help points.

The station is equipped with an inclined lift, making the platforms accessible.

== See also ==
- List of Hamburg U-Bahn stations
- Hamburger Verkehrsverbund
- Hamburger Hochbahn
