= Alsterdorf station =

Railway station in Hamburg, Germany

Alsterdorf
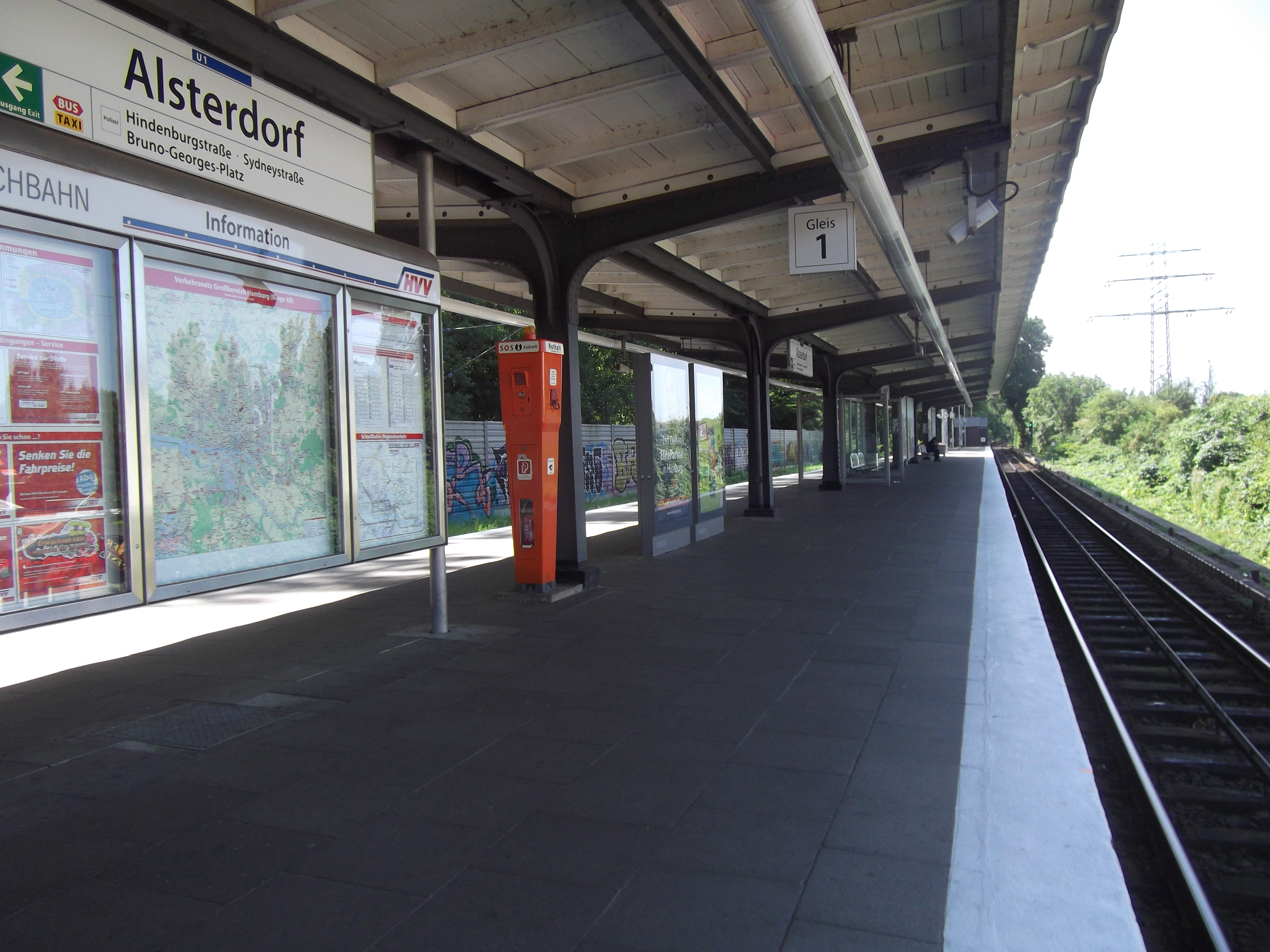

General information
- Location: Hindenburgstraße; 22297 Hamburg, Germany
- Coordinates: 53°36′23″N 10°00′42″E
- System: Hamburg U-Bahn station
- Operator: Hamburger Hochbahn AG
- Line: U1
- Platforms: 1 island platform
- Tracks: 2
- Connections: Bus

Construction
- Structure type: Elevated
- Accessible: Yes

Other information
- Station code: HHA: AL
- Fare zone: HVV: A / 103 and 105

History
- Opened: 1 December 1914; 111 years ago
- Rebuilt: 2024
- Electrified: at opening

Services
Preceding station	Hamburg U-Bahn	Following station
Sengelmannstraße towards Norderstedt Mitte	U1	Lattenkamp towards Großhansdorf or Ohlstedt
Location
- Location within Hamburg Location within Germany

Alsterdorf is a metro station on the Hamburg U-Bahn line U1. The station was opened in December 1914 and is located in the Hamburg district of Alsterdorf, Germany. Alsterdorf is part of the borough of Hamburg-Nord.

== Location ==
The station is located on the southern edge of the eponymous district of Alsterdorf, right on the border with Winterhude. For several years now, the Hamburg police headquarters have been in the immediate vicinity. The track of the Hamburg freight bypass is located on the same embankment south of the metro tracks.

== Structure and history ==
Alsterdorf has a central platform suitable for 120-meter-long trains on the embankment. The only access is at the northeast end and has fixed stairs, an escalator, and an elevator between the north end of the platform and the street level between the railway bridges.

The stop was opened as early as 1914 as part of the former elevated railway branch line Ohlsdorf - Kellinghusenstraße, which later became part of today's U1. The access building was extensively modernized at the end of the 1990s and 2024. The originally building was rebuilt as part of the modernization measures.

== Service ==
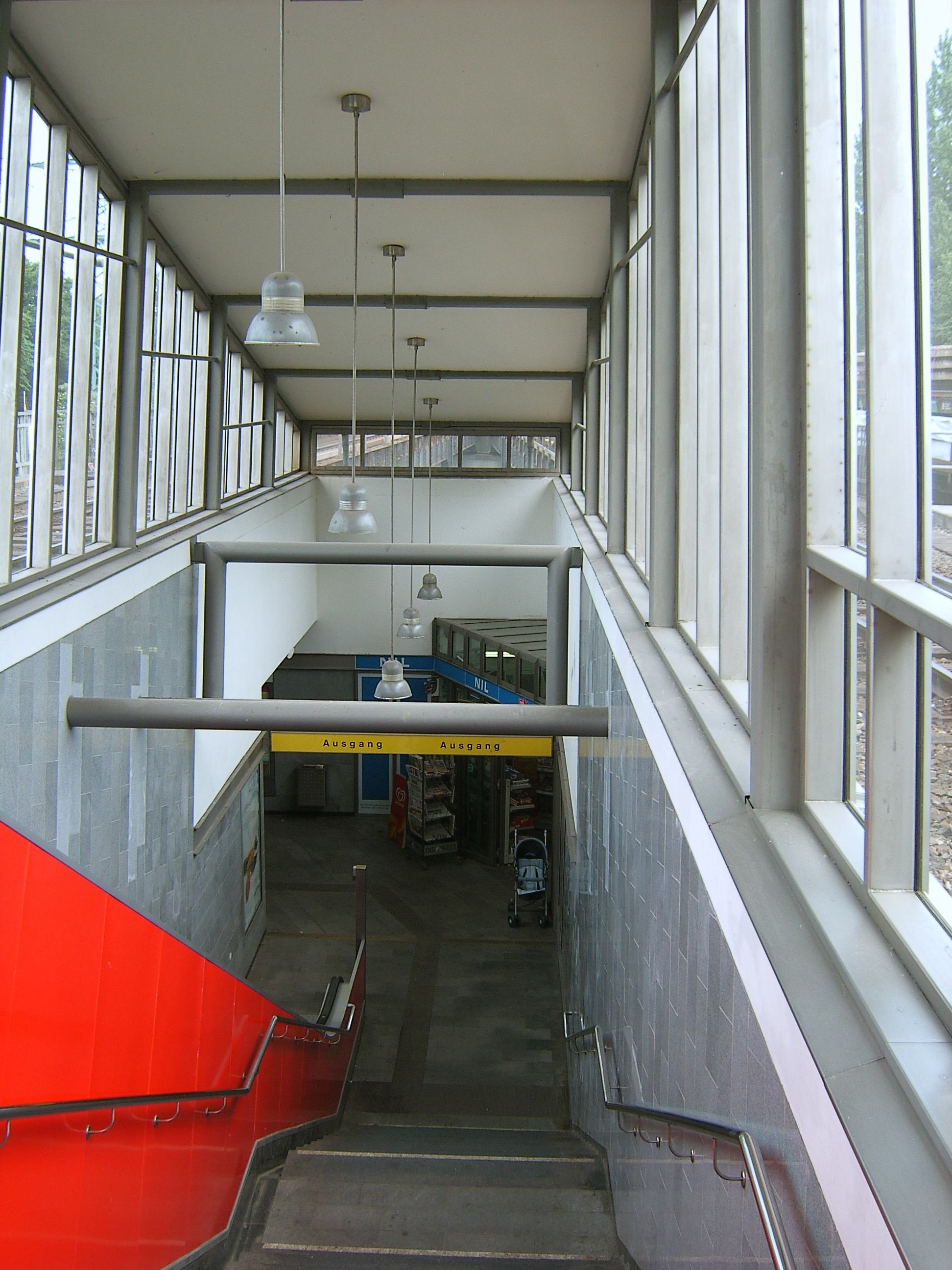
The station's underpass

=== Trains ===
Alsterdorf is served by U-Bahn line U1; departures are every 5 minutes. Bus lines 19, 23, 218, 179, and night bus line 606 have stops at the northeast side of the station.

== See also ==
- List of Hamburg U-Bahn stations
