= Hudtwalckerstraße station =

Railway station in Winterhude, Germany

Hudtwalckerstraße
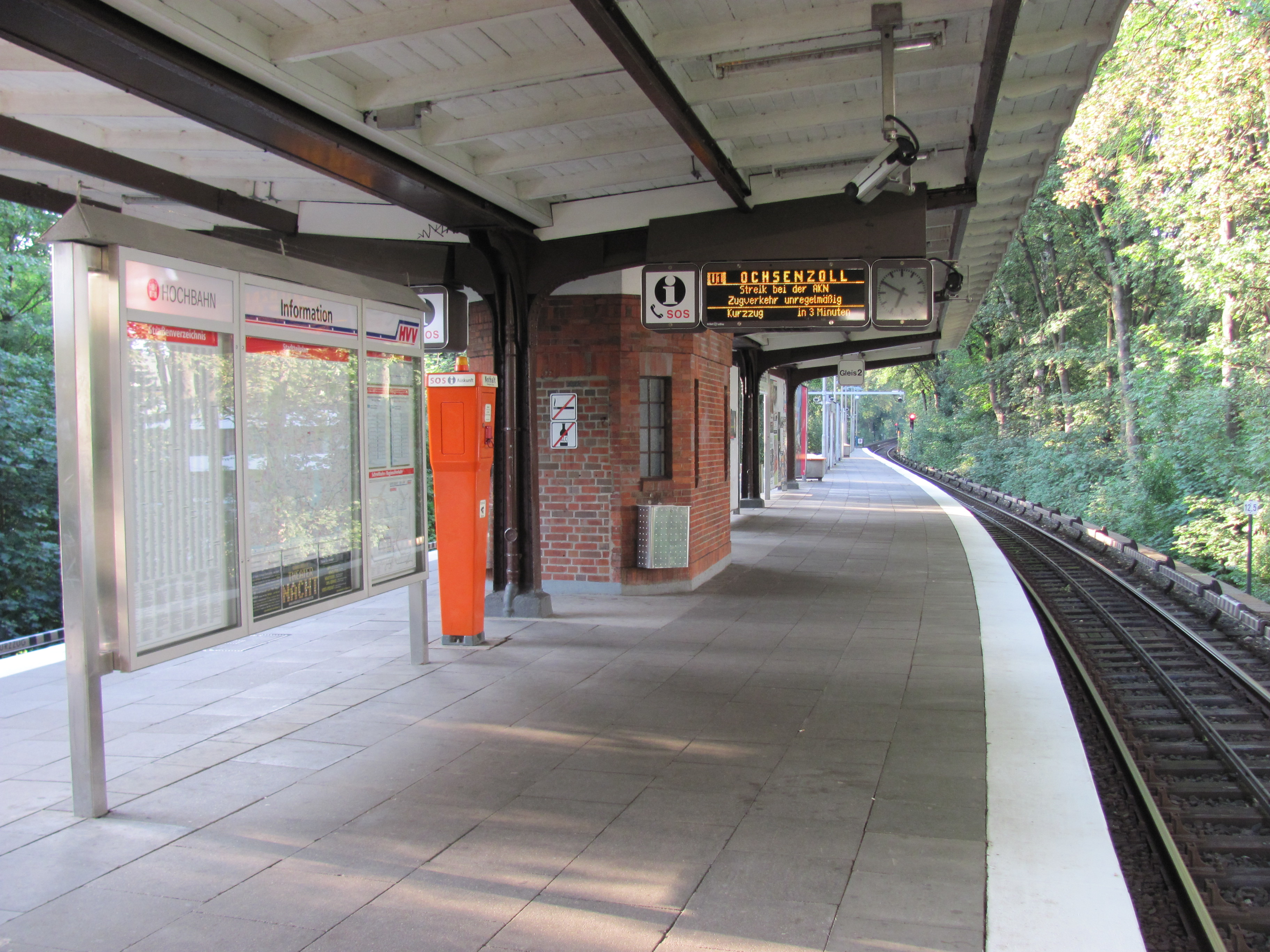

General information
- Location: Hudtwalckerstraße; 22299 Hamburg, Germany
- Coordinates: 53°35′40″N 09°59′46″E
- System: Hamburg U-Bahn station
- Operator: Hamburger Hochbahn AG
- Line: U1
- Platforms: 1 island platform
- Tracks: 2
- Connections: Bus

Construction
- Structure type: Elevated

Other information
- Station code: HHA: HU
- Fare zone: HVV: A/103 and 105

History
- Opened: 1 December 1914; 111 years ago

Services
| Preceding station | Hamburg U-Bahn | Following station |
|---|---|---|
| Lattenkamp towards Norderstedt Mitte | U1 | Kellinghusenstraße towards Großhansdorf or Ohlstedt |
Location
- Location within Hamburg Location within Germany

Hudtwalckerstraße is a metro station on the Hamburg U-Bahn line U1. The station was opened in December 1914 and is located in the Hamburg district of Winterhude, Germany. Winterhude is part of the borough of Hamburg-Nord.

== Service ==
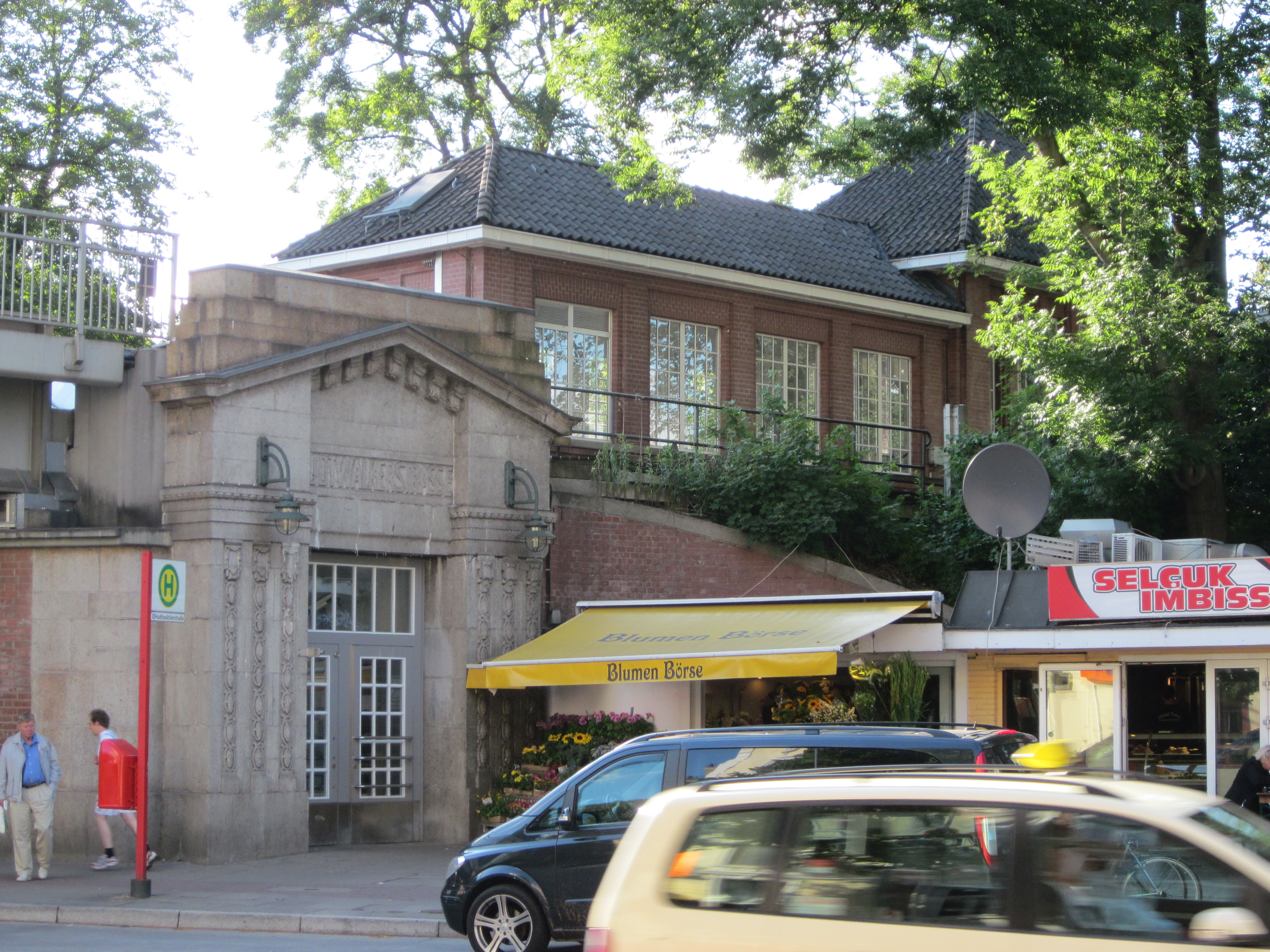
The station's entrance

=== Trains ===
Hudtwalckerstraße is served by Hamburg U-Bahn line U1; departures are every 5 minutes.

== See also ==
- List of Hamburg U-Bahn stations
