= Alsterdorfer Sporthalle =

Arena in Hamburg, Germany

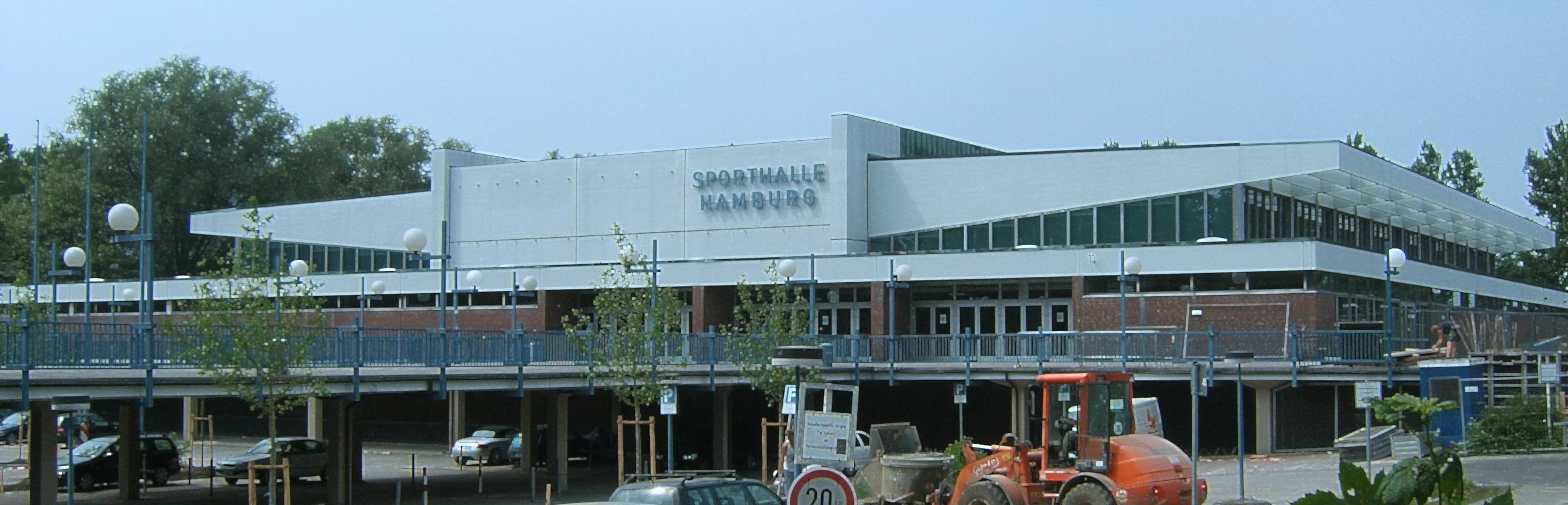
- Exterior of venue (c. 2006)
- Interactive map of Alsterdorfer Sporthalle
- Former names: Sporthalle Hamburg (1968-84)
- Address: Krochmannstraße 55
- Location: Winterhude, Hamburg, Germany
- Coordinates: 53°36′10″N 10°00′07″E
- Owner: Free and Hanseatic City of Hamburg
- Seating type: hard seats
- Capacity: 7,000
- Scoreboard: Yes
- Public transit: Lattenkamp (Sporthalle)

Construction
- Opened: 1968
- Architect: Herbert Schmedje

Tenant
- HSV Hamburg

Website
- hamburg-sporthalle.de

Alsterdorfer Sporthalle (originally known as the Sporthalle Hamburg) is an indoor arena in Hamburg, Germany. The arena holds up to 7,000 people with 4,200 seats. It opened in 1968 and is located in the city's quarter of Winterhude.

== Events ==
It hosts mainly indoor sporting events (HSV Handball), pop & rock concerts and trade shows. The 1978 World Fencing Championships were held here. In July 2010, all matches of the FIBA Under-17 World Championship 2010 were played in this hall. French-Canadian singer Céline Dion performed at the venue during her 1996 world tour. On several occasions, there have been concerts at the Sporthalle by Irish band The Corrs. On the 11 May 2001, Irish vocal pop band Westlife held a concert for their Where Dreams Come True Tour supporting their album Coast to Coast. In 2002, the American girl group Destiny's Child performed for the first time in Hamburg at this venue as part of their Destiny's Child World Tour. From 2012 until 2014 it also played host to the annual PDC World Cup of Darts.

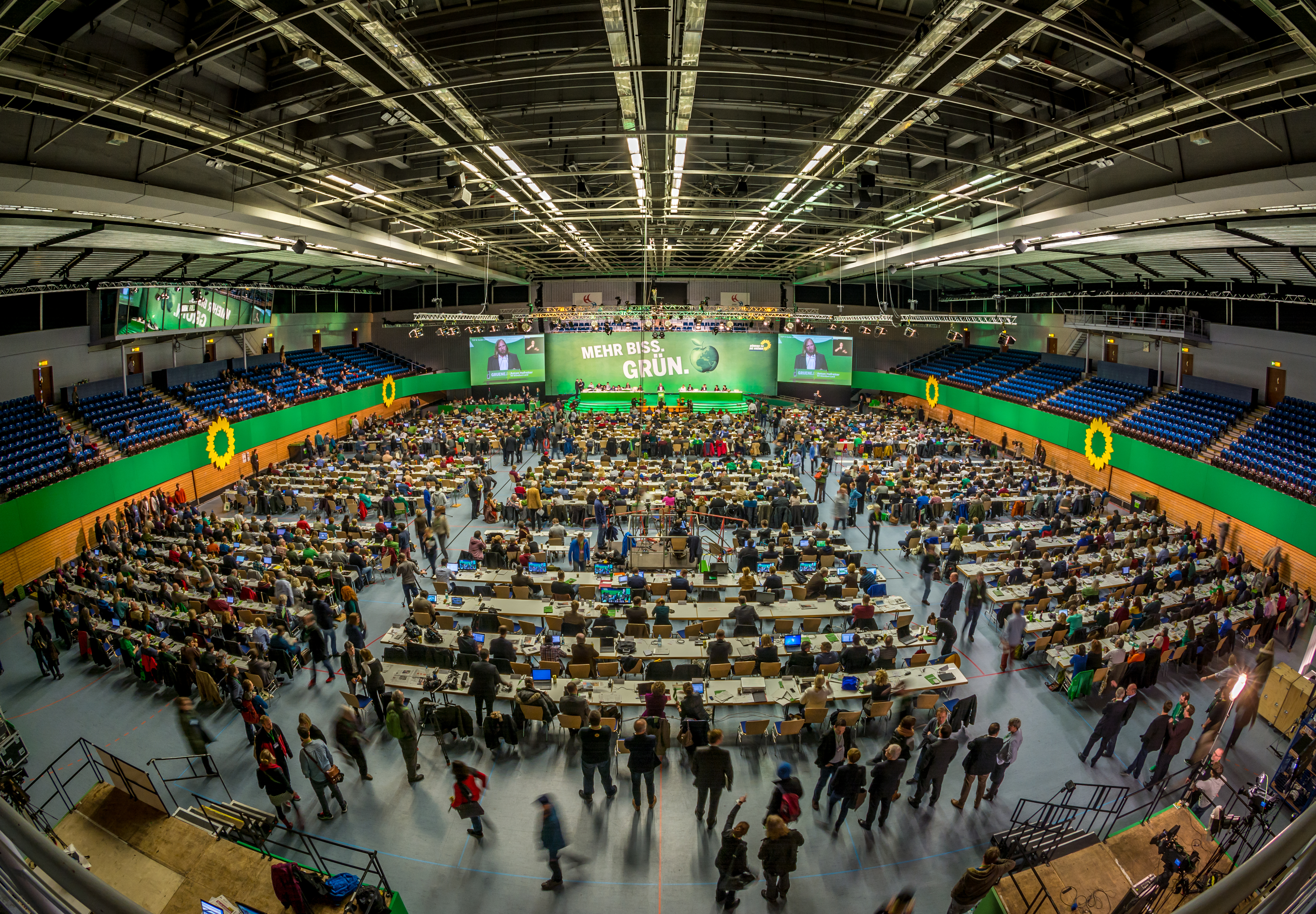
Inside of the Sporthalle (2014)

== See also ==
- List of indoor arenas in Germany
