= Lattenkamp station =

Railway station in Hamburg, Germany

Lattenkamp
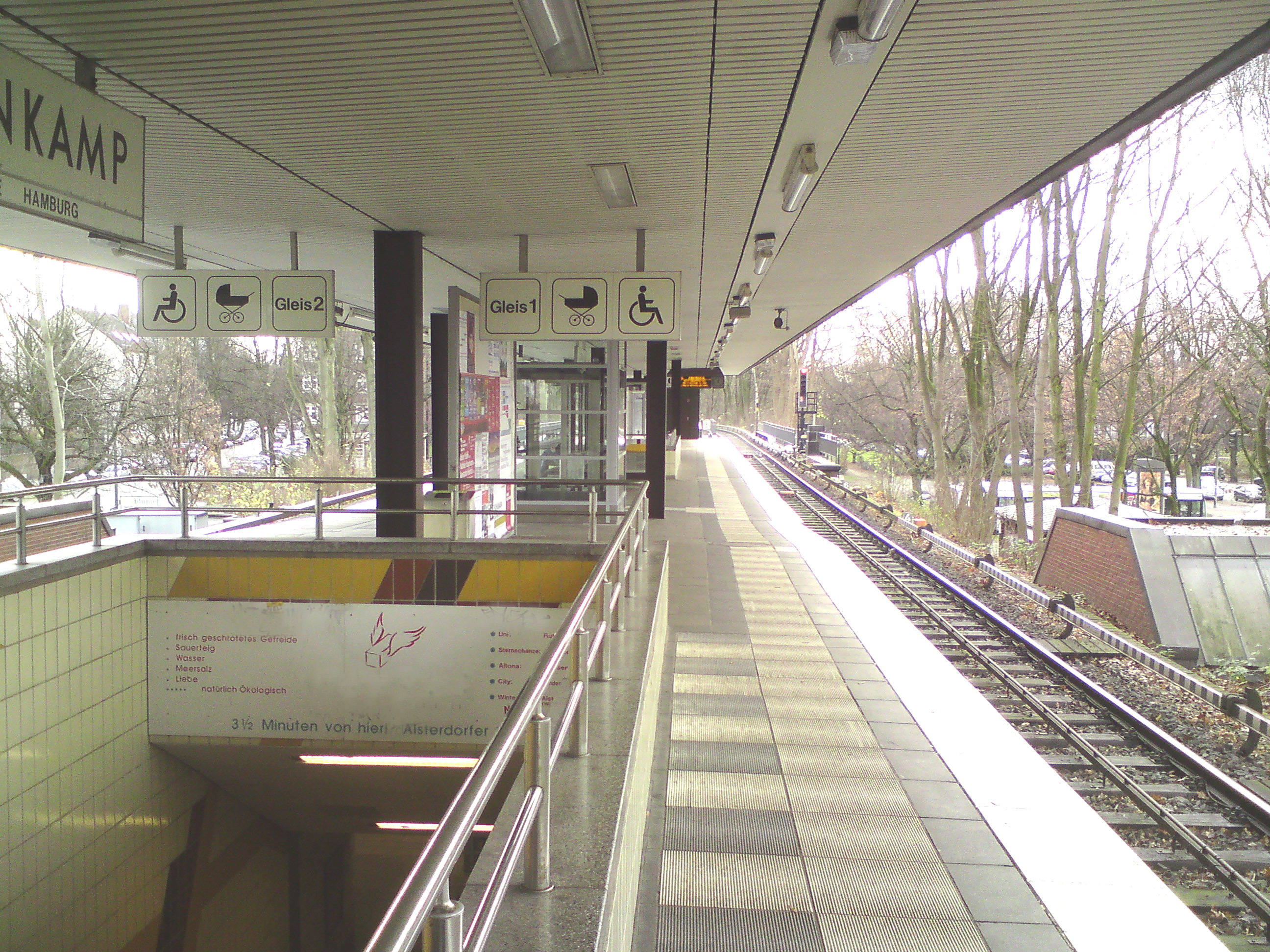

General information
- Location: Lattenkamp; 22299 Hamburg, Germany
- Coordinates: 53°36′00″N 09°59′40″E
- System: Hamburg U-Bahn station
- Operator: Hamburger Hochbahn AG
- Line: U1
- Platforms: 1 island platform
- Tracks: 2
- Connections: Bus

Construction
- Structure type: Elevated
- Accessible: Yes

Other information
- Station code: HHA: LA
- Fare zone: HVV: A/103 and 105

History
- Opened: 1 December 1914; 111 years ago
- Rebuilt: 1982

Services
Preceding station	Hamburg U-Bahn	Following station
Alsterdorf towards Norderstedt Mitte	U1	Hudtwalckerstraße towards Großhansdorf or Ohlstedt
Location
- Location within Hamburg Location within Germany

Lattenkamp is a metro station on the Hamburg U-Bahn line U1. The station was opened in December 1914 and is located in the Winterhude district of Hamburg, Germany. Winterhude is part of the borough of Hamburg-Nord.

== History ==
The metro station Lattenkamp was built during the years 1912 and 1913, as a part of the metro track between Kellinghusenstraße and Ohlsdorf, which is a part of Line U1 in today's time. The station building offering access to the platform was at the Meenkwiese originally. In the early 80s, the station was redesigned and a tunnel with staircases to the platform was built. Due to this change, the original entrance was closed and later demolished.

== Service ==
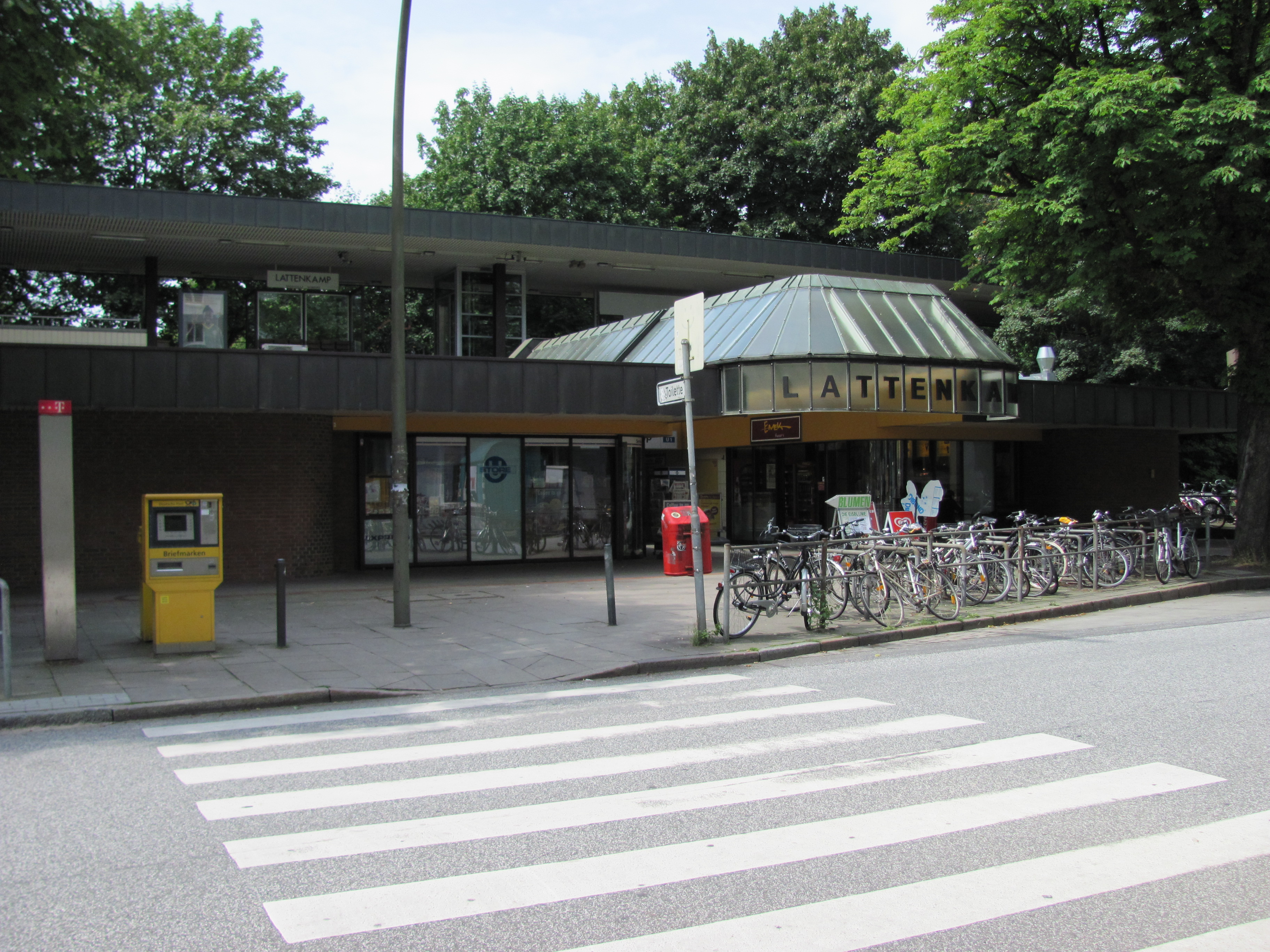
The station's entrance

=== Trains ===
Lattenkamp is served by Hamburg U-Bahn line U1; departures are every 5 minutes.

== See also ==
- List of Hamburg U-Bahn stations
