= Hamburg International =

German airline (1998–2010)

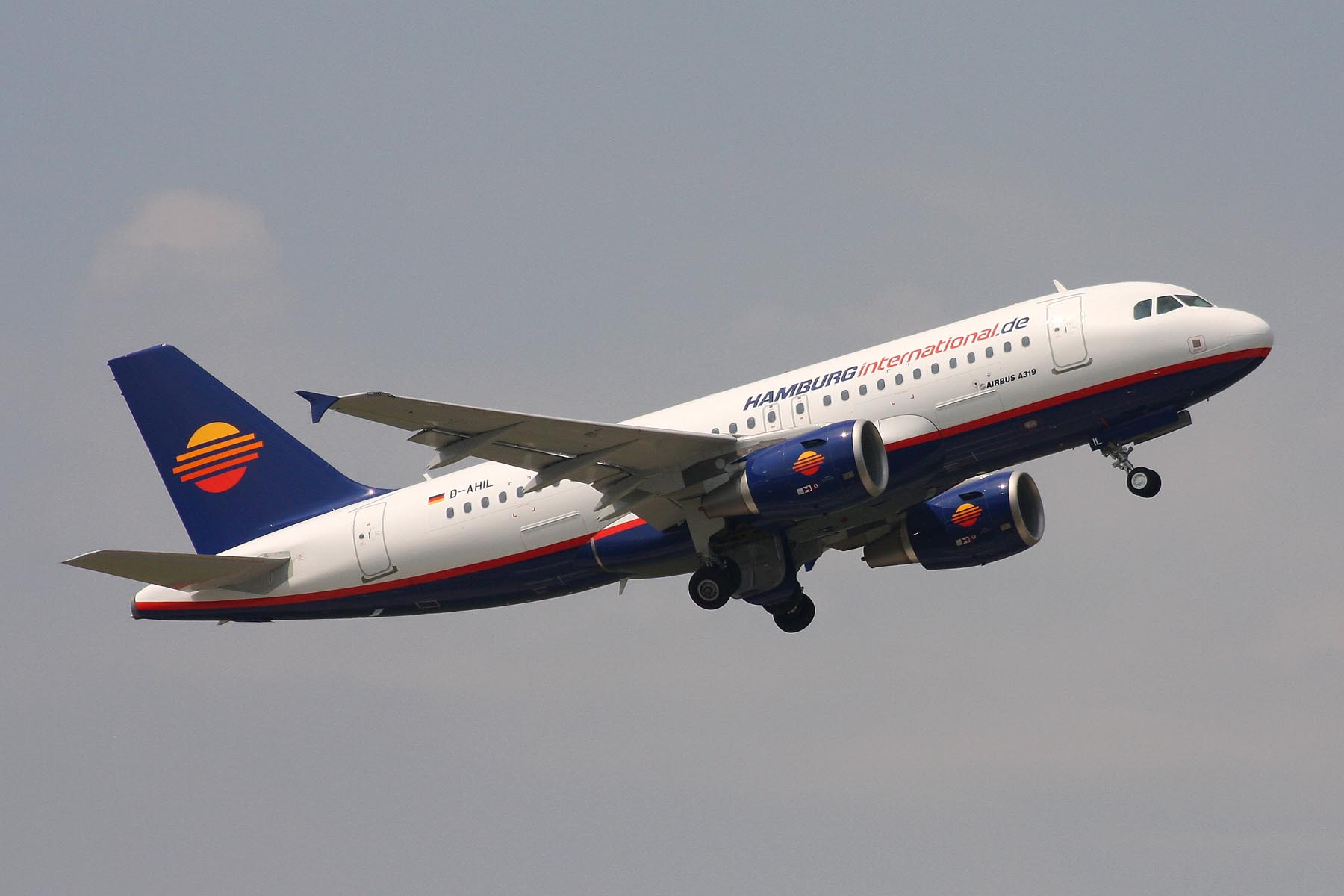
- Airbus A319-100 departing Düsseldorf Airport in 2009
IATA	ICAO	Call sign
4R	HHI	HAMBURG JET
- Founded: July 1998
- Commenced operations: 26 April 1999
- Ceased operations: 20 October 2010
- Operating bases: Hamburg Airport; Friedrichshafen Airport; Munich Airport; Saarbrücken Airport
- Fleet size: 9
- Headquarters: Hamburg-Nord, Hamburg, Germany
- Employees: 215 (2007)
- Website: hamburg-international.de

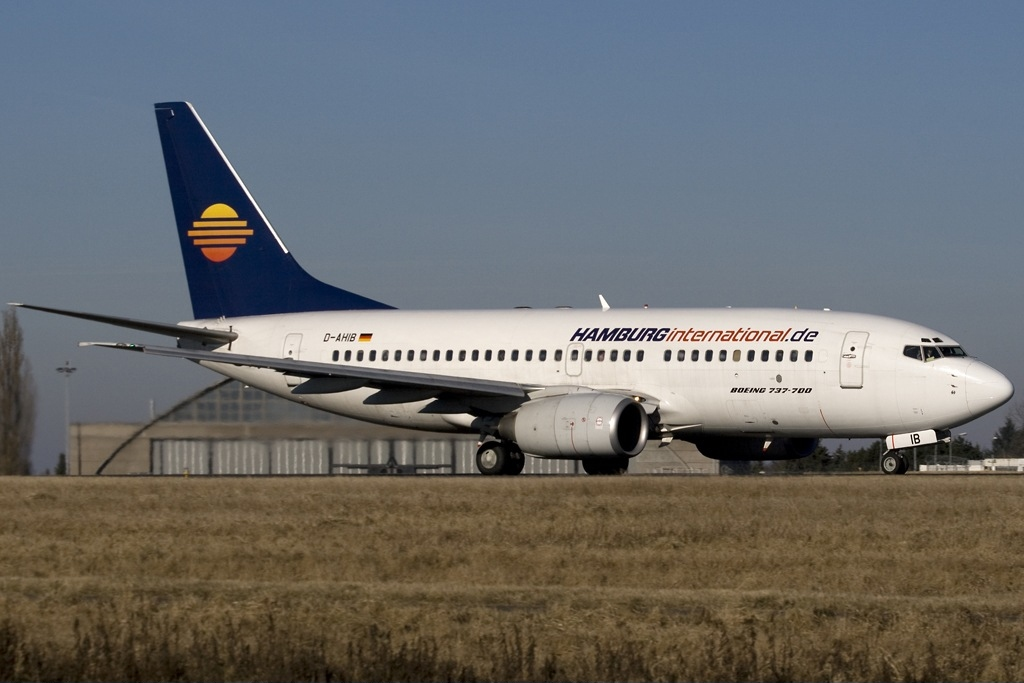
Boeing 737-73S

Hamburg International Luftverkehrsgesellschaft GmbH & Co. Betriebs KG was an independent charter passenger airline based in Hamburg-Nord, Hamburg, Germany, operating scheduled charter services for European tour operators, as well as ad hoc charters and subservices. Its main base was Hamburg Airport, with further bases at Friedrichshafen Airport, Munich Airport and Saarbrücken Airport.

== History ==
The airline was established in July 1998 and started operations on 28 April 1999. It was wholly owned by its management and local venture capitalists and had 215 employees (at March 2007). After several charter contracts were revoked, Hamburg International went bankrupt on 19 October 2010. All aircraft were returned to their lessors, and all flights were cancelled with immediate effect.

== Fleet ==
Over the years, Hamburg International operated the following aircraft types:

Aircraft type	Total	Introduced	Retired	Remarks
Airbus A319-100	10	2008	2010	
Boeing 737-300	1	2006	2009	
Boeing 737-700	6	2001	2010	

== See also ==
- List of defunct airlines of Germany
