= Alsterdorf =

- Quarter of Hamburg
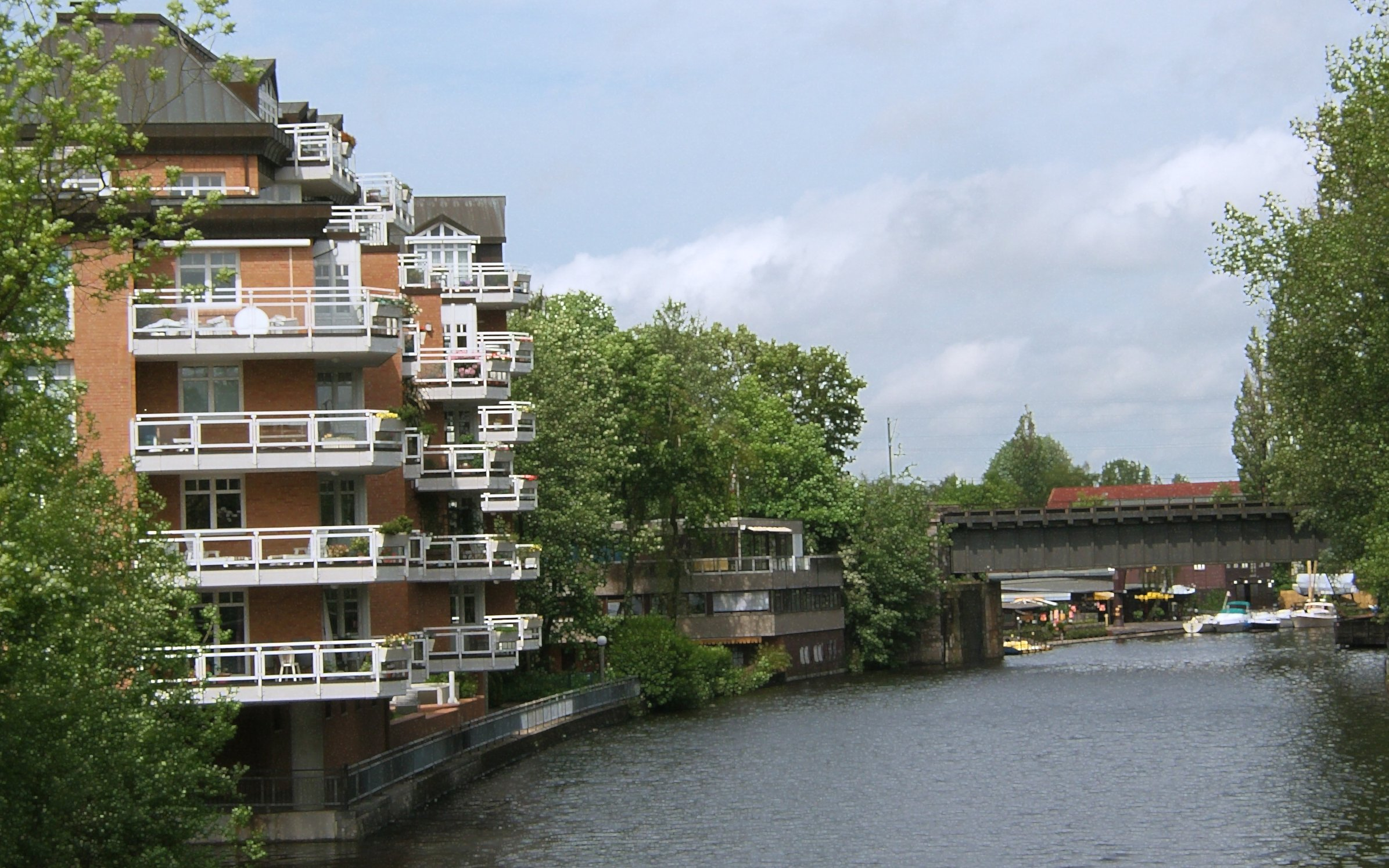
- View of the river Alster.

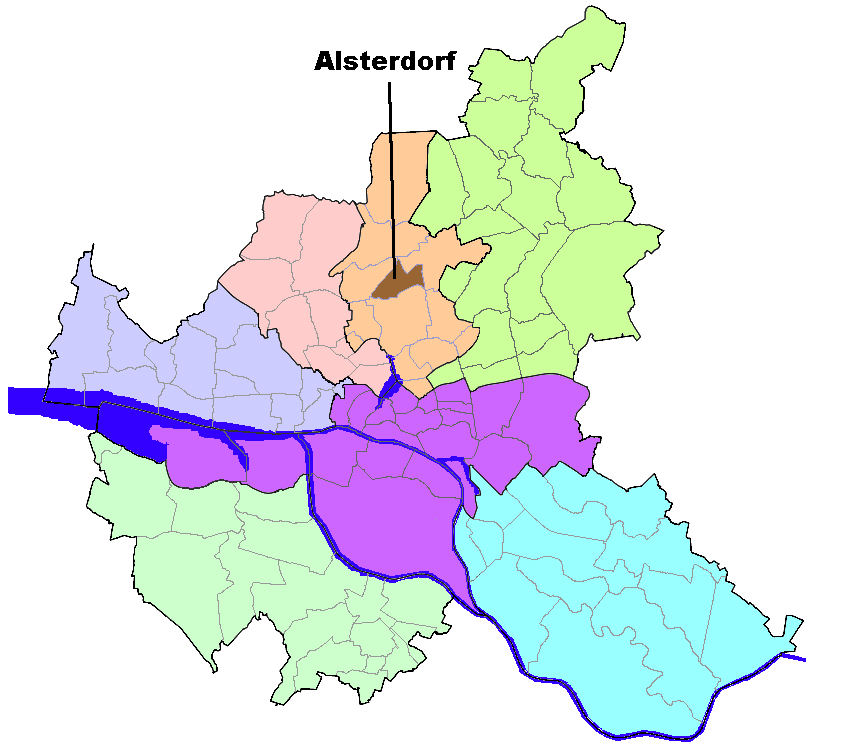
- Location of Alsterdorf in Hamburg
- Interactive map of Alsterdorf
- Location within Germany Location within Hamburg
- Coordinates: 53°36′0″N 10°0′0″E
- Country: Germany
- State: Hamburg
- City: Hamburg
- Borough: Hamburg-Nord

Area
  - Total: 3.1 km^{2} (1.2 sq mi)

Population (2024-12-31)
  - Total: 15,644
  - Density: 5,000/km^{2} (13,000/sq mi)
- Time zone: UTC+01:00 (CET)
  - Summer (DST): UTC+02:00 (CEST)
- Dialling codes: 040
- Vehicle registration: HH

Alsterdorf (German pronunciation: [ˈalstɐdɔʁf]) is a quarter in the Hamburg-Nord borough of the Hamburg, Germany. The name derives from the river Alster and its artificial lakes Außenalster and Binnenalster in the centre of Hamburg. In 2023 the population was 15,108.

== History ==
On 9 March 2023, a mass shooting occurred at a Jehovah's Witnesses center on Deelböge Street, killing seven people including the gunman and injuring eight others.

== Geography ==
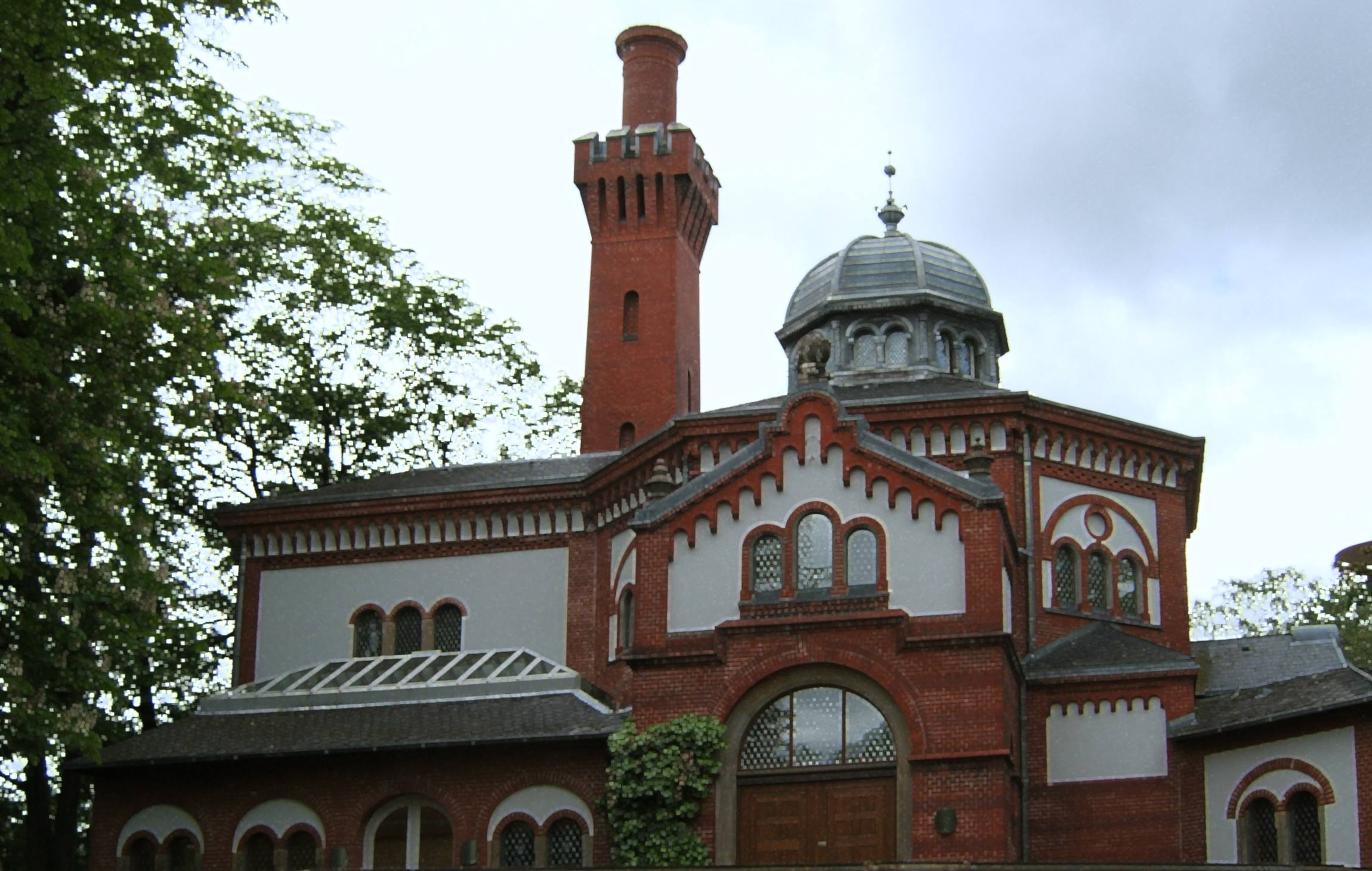
Front of the former crematorium at the Ohlsdorf cemetery.

In 2006 according to the statistical office of Hamburg and Schleswig-Holstein, the quarter Alsterdorf has a total area of 3.1 km^{2} (1 sq mi). The river Alster floating from Northeast to Southwest is the border to the Groß Borstel quarter in the West. In the South Alsterdorf borders to Winterhude quarter. In the East is the Ohlsdorf quarter.

Parts of the large Ohlsdorf Cemetery (Ohlsdorfer Friedhof (in German)) belongs to the quarter Alsterdorf.

== Demographics ==
2006 there were 12,955 people living in Alsterdorf. The population density was 4,232/km^{2} (10,961/sq mi). 14.2% were children under the age of 18, and 20.2% were 65 years of age or older. 11.6% were resident aliens. 467 people were registered as unemployed.

In 1999 there were 6,508 households, out of which 15.3% had children under the age of 18 living with them and 54.4% of all households were made up of individuals. The average household size was 1.77.

Population by year

1987	1988	1989	1990	1991	1992	1993	1994	1995	1996	1997	1998	1999
12,455	12,487	12,551	12,563	12,520	12,449	12,622	12,577	12,476	12,209	12,027	11,847	11,827

2000	2001	2002	2003	2004	2005	2006
12,180	12,379	12,480	12,723	12,825	12,872	12,955

In 2006 there were 1,283 criminal offences (99 crimes per 1,000 people).

There were 1 elementary school and 2 secondary schools in the quarter Alsterdorf and 30 physicians in private practice and 5 pharmacies.

== Politics ==
These are the results of Alsterdorf in the Hamburg state election:

Election	SPD	Greens	CDU	Left	FDP	AfD	Others
2020	38,2 %	26,9 %	12,1 %	7,1 %	6,5 %	4,0 %	5,2 %
2015	48,1 %	12,4 %	15,1 %	5,9 %	9,7 %	5,6 %	4,2 %
2011	39,8 %	12,0 %	22,5 %	4,5 %	8,8 %	–	3,4 %
2008	31,4 %	10,7 %	45,7 %	4,8 %	5,7 %	–	1,7 %
2004	30,1 %	13,6 %	47,3 %	–	4,3 %	–	4,7 %
2001	36,7 %	9,2 %	28,8 %	0,1 %	6,3 %	–	18,9 %
1997	33,0 %	14,7 %	32,9 %	0,4 %	5,2 %	–	13,8 %
1993	37,3 %	14,0 %	28,6 %	–	5,4 %	–	14,7 %

== Sports ==
Until the opening of O2 World Hamburg in 2002, the Alsterdorfer Sporthalle was the largest indoor sports venue in Hamburg, serving also as a hall for concerts, trade fairs and others.

== Transportation ==
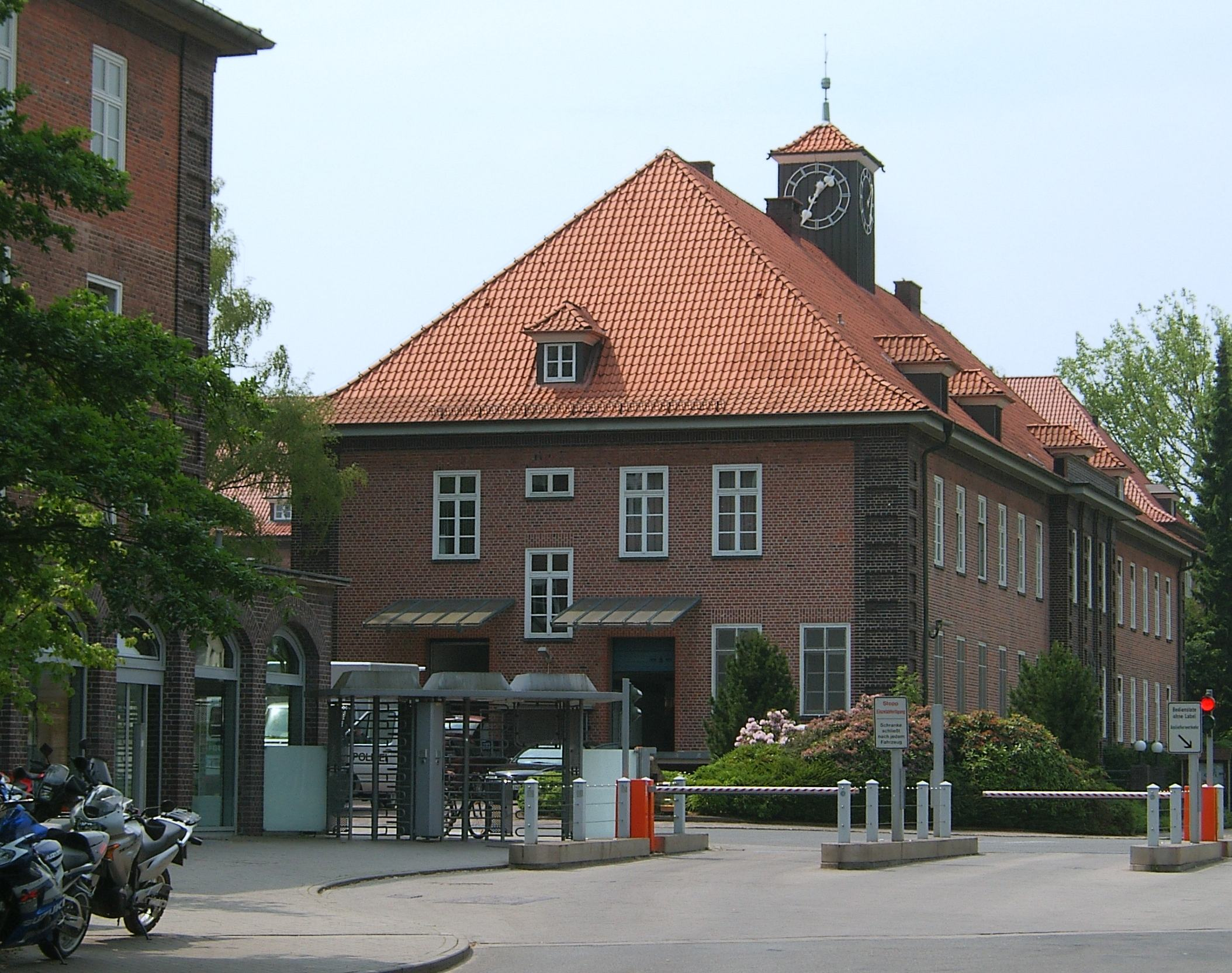
View of the state police school.

Alsterdorf is serviced by the rapid transit system of the underground railway . According to the Department of Motor Vehicles (Kraftfahrt-Bundesamt), in the quarter were 4,847 private cars registered (377 cars/1000 people).

== Notes ==
=== References ===
- Statistical office Hamburg and Schleswig-Holstein Statistisches Amt für Hamburg und Schleswig-Holstein, official website (in German)
