= Eppendorf, Hamburg =

Eppendorf
- Quarter of Hamburg
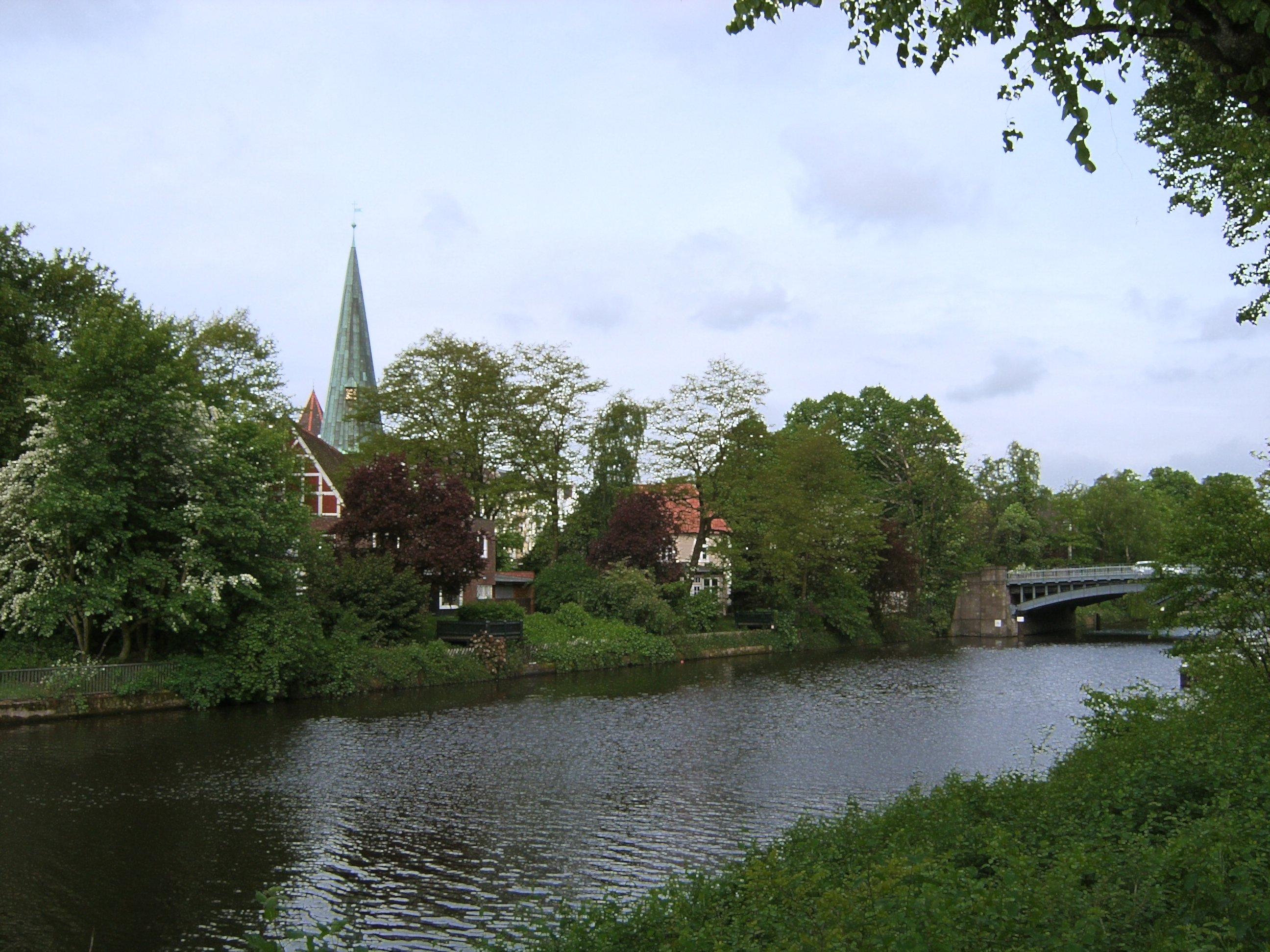
- St. John's church near River Alster
- Interactive map of Eppendorf
- Location within Germany Location within Hamburg
- Coordinates: 53°35′44″N 9°59′2″E
- Country: Germany
- State: Hamburg
- City: Hamburg
- Borough: Hamburg-Nord

Area
  - Total: 2.7 km^{2} (1.0 sq mi)

Population (2024-12-31)
  - Total: 25,234
  - Density: 9,300/km^{2} (24,000/sq mi)
- Time zone: UTC+01:00 (CET)
  - Summer (DST): UTC+02:00 (CEST)
- Dialling codes: 040
- Vehicle registration: HH

Eppendorf (German pronunciation: [ˈɛpn̩dɔʁf]) is one of thirteen quarters in the Hamburg-Nord borough of Hamburg, Germany, and lies north of the Außenalster. In 2023 the population was 25,253.

== History ==
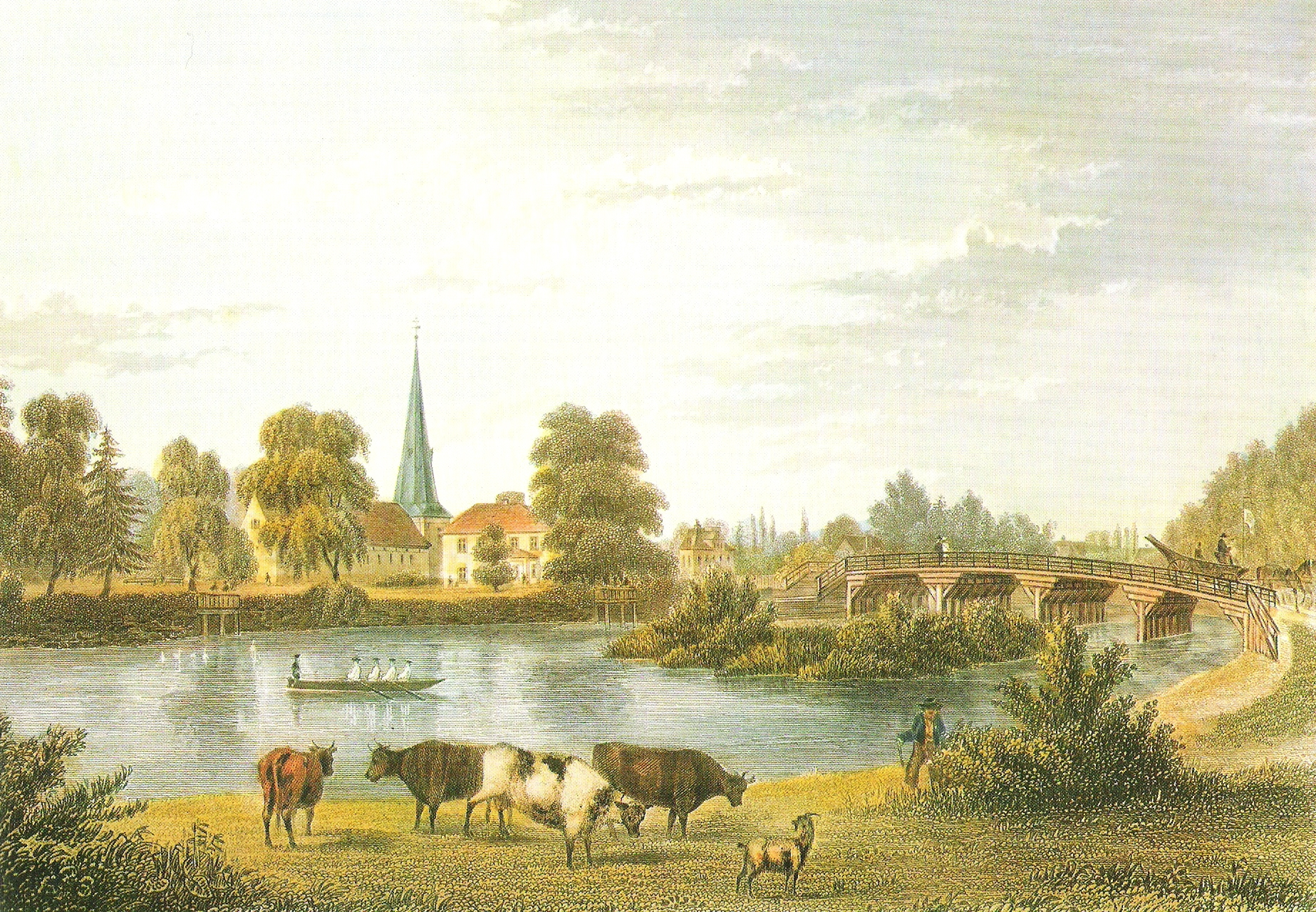
Eppendorf in 1845, similar view as above

Eppendorf, first mentioned as Eppenthorp in 1140, is Hamburg's oldest village. Its name originates either from the old Germanic epen (on the water) or from the personal name Ebbo/Eppo. It is possible, but unlikely, that it was named after Ebbo, the archbishop of Reims. During the restoration of the St. Johannis Church, which was first mentioned in 1267, ruins of an older stone tower were found.

In the 19th century, Eppendorf gained popularity among the affluent of Hamburg. The low-lying, moist land was banked up and built on. The last area of moorland, the Eppendorfer Moor, was placed under nature protection in 1982.

In 1894, Eppendorf was transferred to Hamburg.

== Geography ==
In 2007 according to the statistical office of Hamburg and Schleswig-Holstein, the quarter Eppendorf has an area of 2,7 km^{2}.

The Isebekkanal flows into the River Alster in Eppendorf. The Tarpenbek flows through the Eppendorfer Mühlenteich, which is where the swans spend the winter, into the Alster, also in Eppendorf.

=== Parks ===
- Hayns Park
- Meenkwiese
- Eppendorfer Mühlenteich
- Kellinghusenpark
- Eppendorfer Park
- Seelemannpark

== Transport ==
Eppendorf has the U-Bahn station Kellinghusenstraße, which is an interchange station between the U1 and U3 lines. Several bus routes meet at Eppendorfer Marktplatz.

== Infrastructure ==
The University Medical Center Hamburg-Eppendorf (Universitätsklinikum Hamburg-Eppendorf) was built starting in 1879 and founded in 1884. It has been a university medical center since 1934.

The swimming baths, Holthusenbad, were designed by Fritz Schumacher and erected between 1912 and 1914.

== Politics ==
These are the results of Eppendorf in the Hamburg state election:

Election	SPD	Greens	CDU	Left	FDP	AfD	Others
2020	33,8 %	33,8 %	9,6 %	7,5 %	7,4 %	2,6 %	5,3 %
2015	43,1 %	16,5 %	14,4 %	7,6 %	11,7 %	3,3 %	3,4 %
2011	46,6 %	15,2 %	18,6 %	4,9 %	9,9 %	–	4,8 %
2008	32,0 %	13,7 %	41,7 %	4,9 %	6,4 %	–	1,3 %
2004	30,2 %	19,8 %	43,0 %	–	2,9 %	–	4,1 %
2001	39,6 %	15,0 %	23,9 %	0,5 %	7,8 %	–	13,2 %
1997	32,4 %	23,8 %	28,2 %	0,8 %	4,8 %	–	10,0 %
1993	37,0 %	24,3 %	20,9 %	–	5,5 %	–	12,3 %
1991	46,1 %	15,1 %	28,5 %	0,8 %	6,6 %	–	2,9 %
1987	46,5 %	12,8 %	31,7 %	–	7,8 %	–	1,2 %
1986	38,3 %	18,9 %	35,5 %	–	6,3 %	–	1,0 %
Dec. 1982	48,5 %	12,2 %	35,1 %	–	2,9 %	–	1,3 %
Jun. 1982	39,7 %	13,9 %	39,2 %	–	5,1 %	–	2,1 %
1978	46,8 %	7,0 %	35,9 %	–	6,5 %	–	3,8 %
1974	41,6 %	–	42,8 %	–	11,0 %	–	4,6 %
1970	51,3 %	–	35,4 %	–	8,2 %	–	5,1 %
1966	53,5 %	–	34,2 %	–	8,0 %	–	4,3 %

== Culture ==
The music venue Onkel Pö was located in Eppendorf.

=== Education ===
- Gymnasium Eppendorf

== People ==
- Wolfgang Borchert, German writer
- Ernst Thälmann, communist leader
- Uwe Seeler, German footballer
- Samy Deluxe, German rapper
- Jan Delay (Jan Eißfeldt), German rapper
- Karl Dall, German comedian
