= Winterhude =

- Quarter of Hamburg
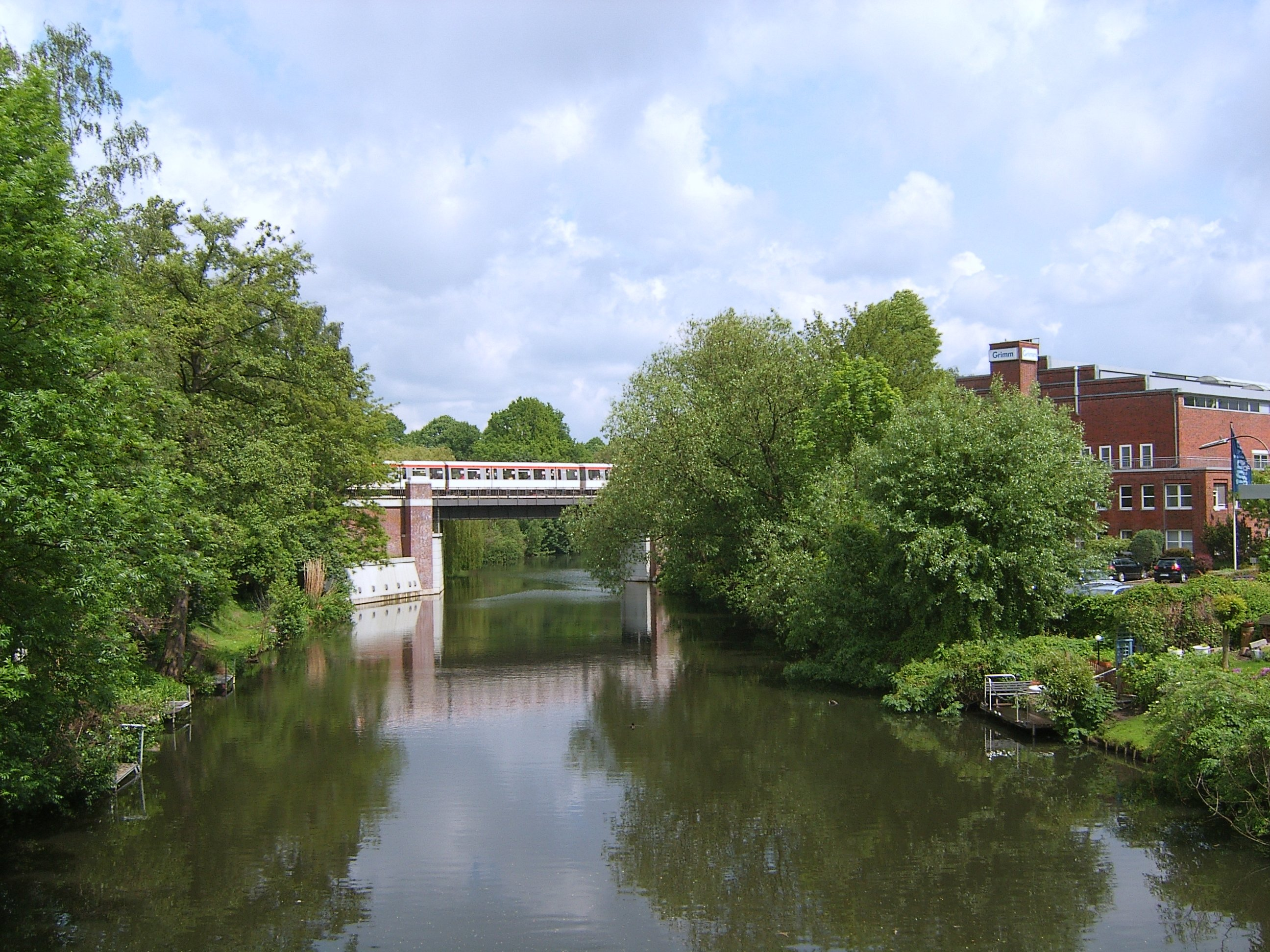
- The channel Goldbekkanal with Hamburg U-Bahn bridge

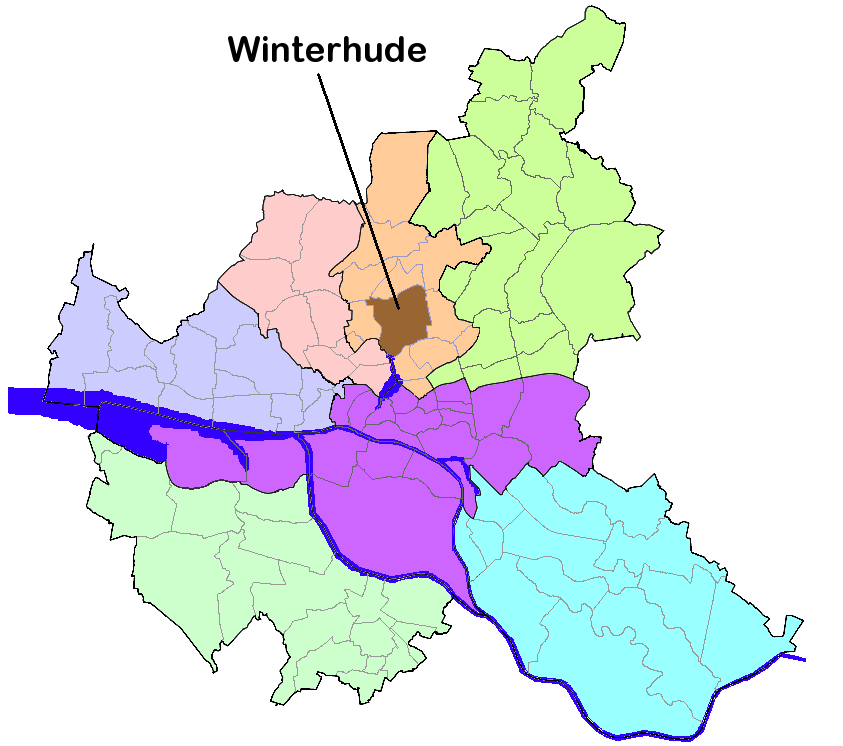
- Location of Winterhude in Hamburg
- Interactive map of Winterhude
- Location within Germany Location within Hamburg
- Coordinates: 53°36′0″N 10°0′0″E
- Country: Germany
- State: Hamburg
- City: Hamburg
- Borough: Hamburg-Nord

Area
  - Total: 7.6 km^{2} (2.9 sq mi)

Population (2024-12-31)
  - Total: 61,192
  - Density: 8,100/km^{2} (21,000/sq mi)
- Time zone: UTC+01:00 (CET)
  - Summer (DST): UTC+02:00 (CEST)
- Dialling codes: 040
- Vehicle registration: HH

Winterhude (German pronunciation: [vɪntɐˈhuːdə]) is a quarter in the ward Hamburg-Nord of Hamburg, Germany. As of 2020, the population was 56,382.

== History ==
Winterhude was first mentioned in the 13th century, but archeological findings of tools, weapons and grave-mounds were dated to 1700 BC and 700 BC.

During World War II, the port of Hamburg and therefore Winterhude were targets of the air raids of the so-called Operation Gomorrah.

== Geography ==
In 2006, according to the statistical office of Hamburg and Schleswig-Holstein, the Winterhude quarter has a total area of 7.6 km^{2}. To the north is the Alsterdorf quarter and the Barmbek-Nord quarter is in the east. In the west are the Eppendorf and the Harvestehude quarters and in the south are the Uhlenhorst and Barmbek-Süd quarters.

The City Park of Hamburg (Hamburger Stadtpark) is located within Winterhude.

== Demographics ==
In 2007, the population of the Winterhude quarter was 48,799. The population density was 6,439 inhabitants per square kilometre (16,677/sq mi). 10.6% were children under the age of 18, and 15% were 65 years of age or older. 11,8% were immigrants. 1,684 people were registered as unemployed. In 1999, there were 31,732 households, and 60.4% of all households were made up of individuals. The average household size was 1.61.

Population by year

1709	1810	1811	1834	1838
100	238	242	325	380

1939	1950	1961	1970	1980
65,937	90,623	79,235	61,899	50,787

1987	1988	1989	1990	1991	1992	1993	1994	1995	1996	1997	1998	1999
47,225	46,988	47,236	47,767	48,404	49,460	49,449	49,819	49,040	49,192	48,536	48,536	48,756

2000	2001	2002	2003	2004	2005	2006	2007
48,653	48,469	48,421	48,610	48,532	48,602	49,018	48,799

In 2007, there were 4,622 criminal offences (95/1000 people).

== Education ==
In 2006, there were 6 elementary schools and 3 secondary schools in the Winterhude quarter with 3,959 pupils.

== Infrastructure ==
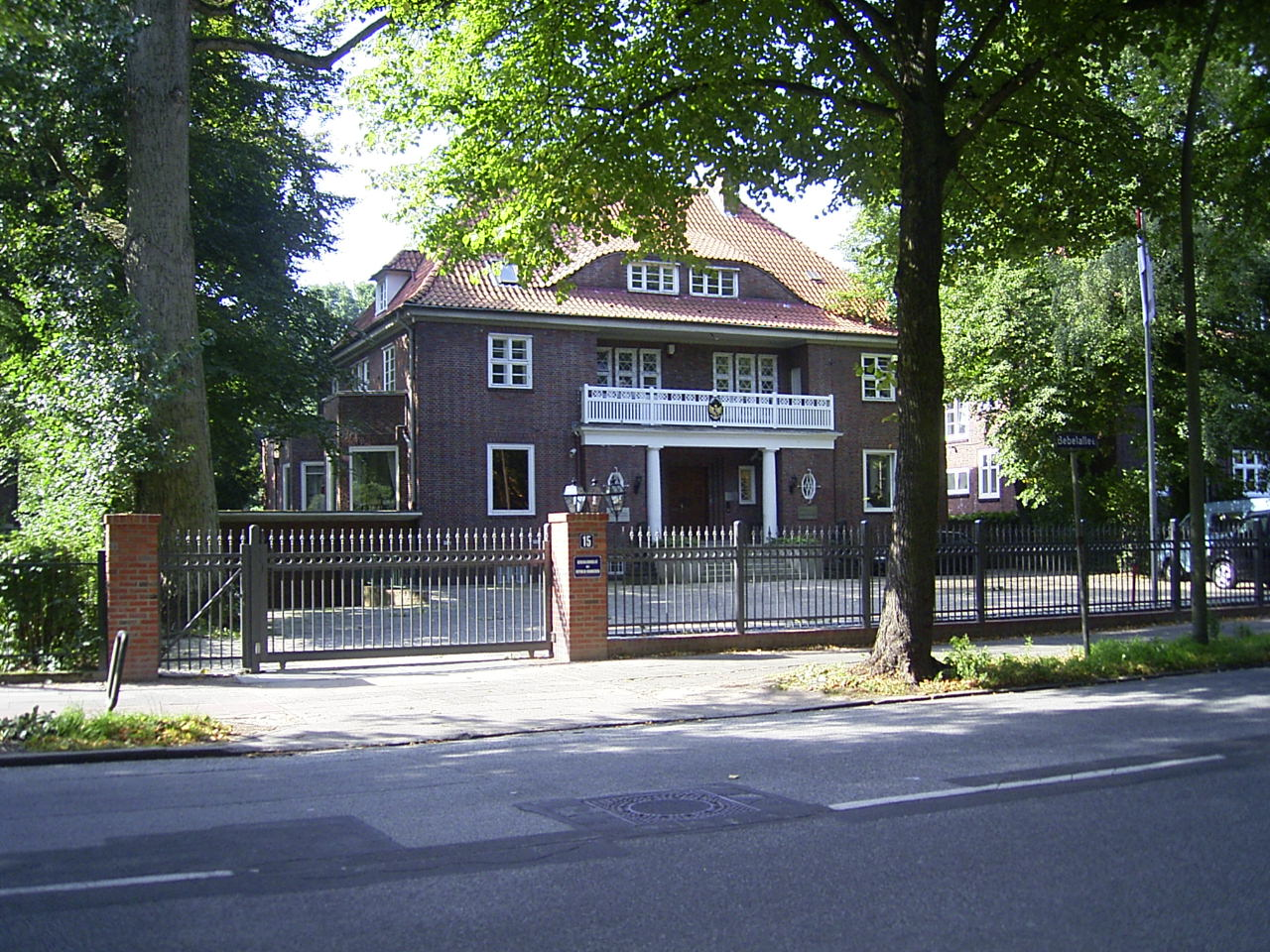
Indonesian Consulate in Hamburg

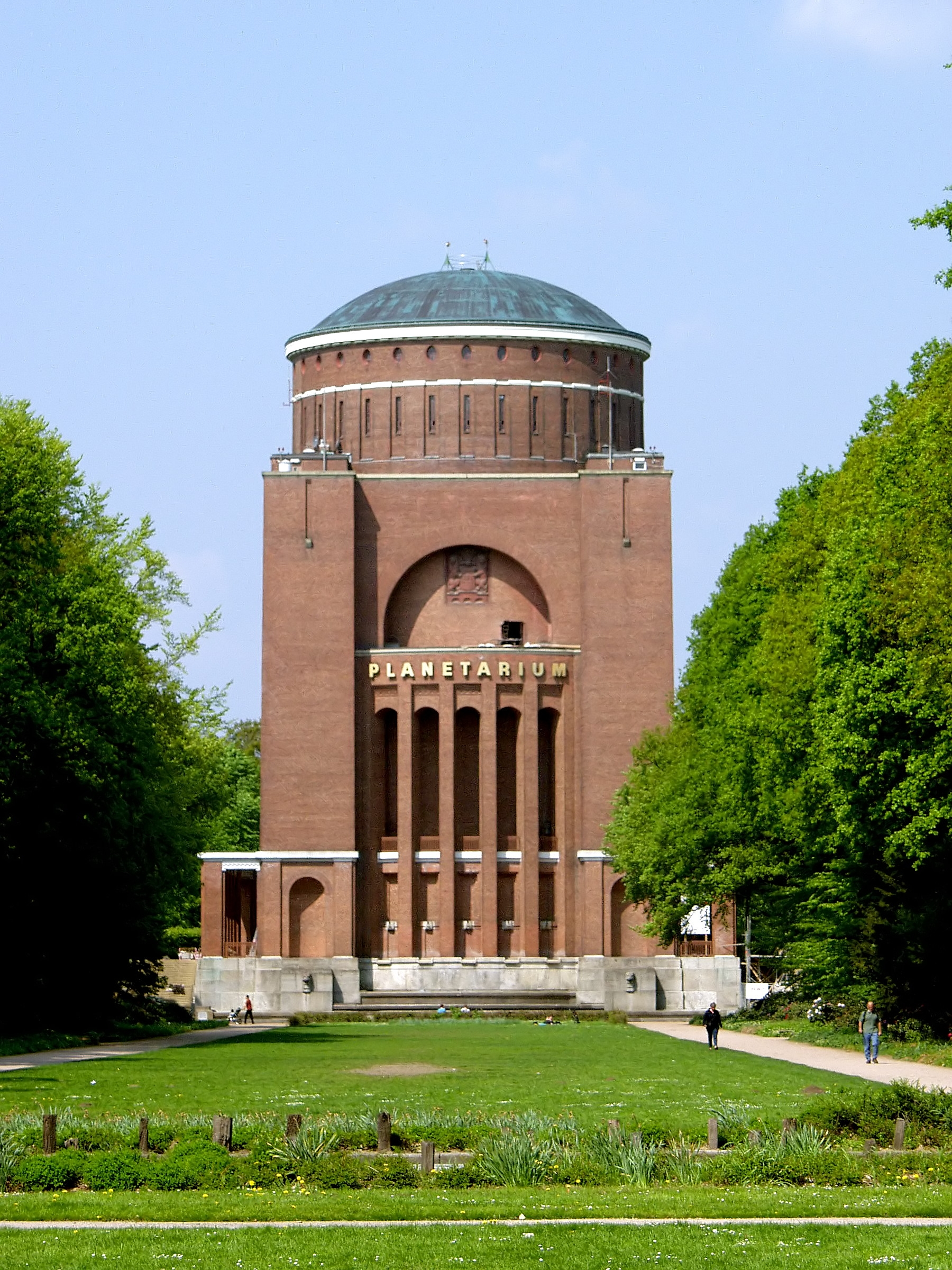
Planetarium in the city park (2003)

Established in 1956, the Consulate-General of the Republic of Indonesia is located in the quarter. The Consulate-General of the Islamic Republic of Iran was established in 1858 and is also located in the street Bebelallee.

=== Health systems ===
The hospital Israelitisches Krankenhaus has 180 beds.

There were 32 day-care centers for children, 156 physicians in private practice and 16 pharmacies.

=== Transportation ===
Winterhude is serviced by the rapid transit system of the underground railway with several stations: Sierichstraße, Borgweg und Saarlandstraße (yellow line U3), Hudtwalkerstraße and Lattenkamp (blue line U1). According to the Department of Motor Vehicles (Kraftfahrt-Bundesamt), in the quarter Winterhude were 15,992 private cars registered (328 cars/1000 people).
