= Hamburg-Nord =

- Borough of Hamburg
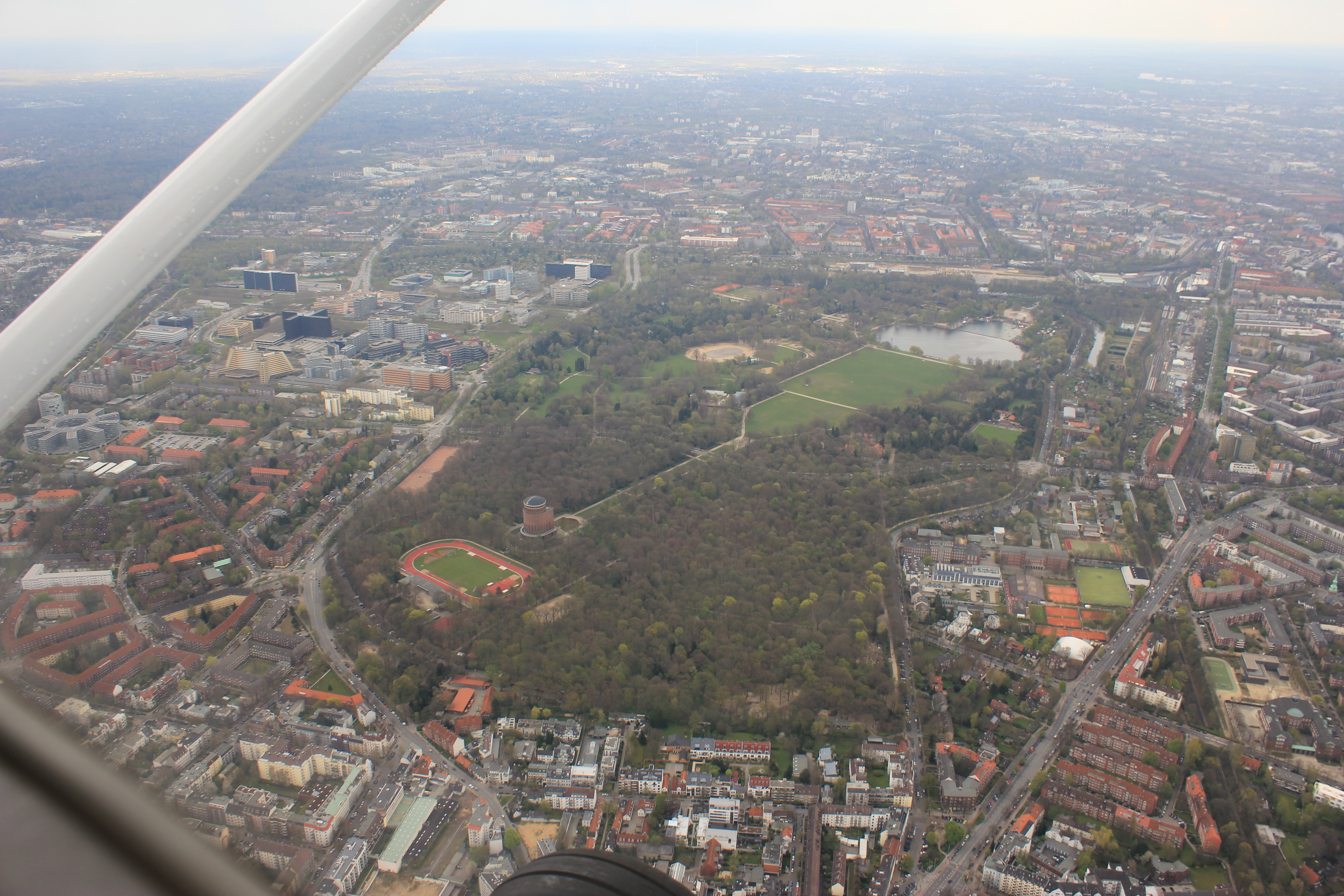

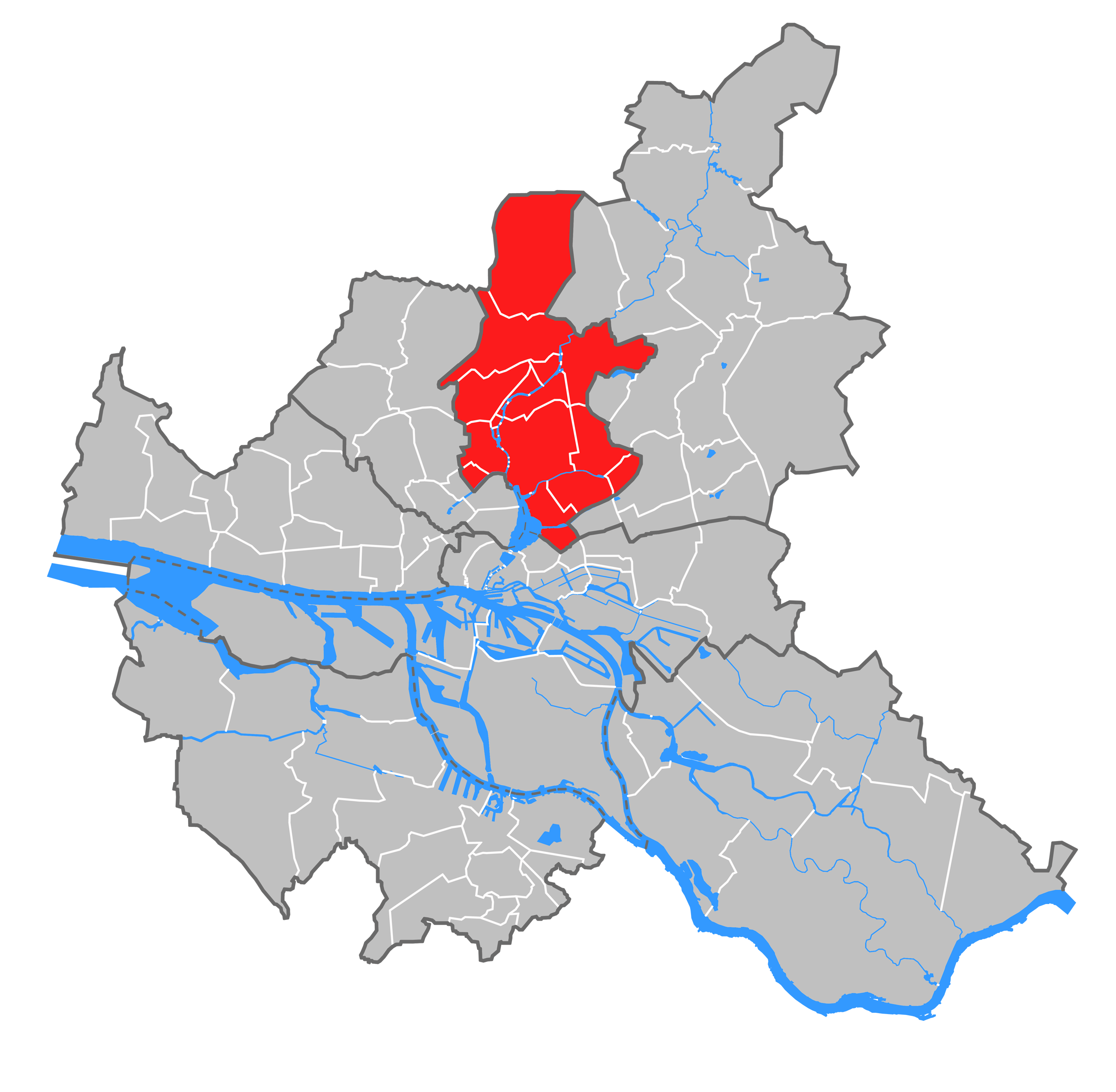
- Boroughs of Hamburg
- Interactive map of Hamburg-Nord
- Location within Germany Location within Hamburg
- Coordinates: 53°37′N 10°00′E
- Country: Germany
- State: Hamburg
- City: Hamburg
- Subdivisions: 12 quarters

Area
  - Total: 57.5 km^{2} (22.2 sq mi)

Population (2024-12-31)
  - Total: 331,291
  - Density: 5,760/km^{2} (14,900/sq mi)
- Time zone: UTC+01:00 (CET)
  - Summer (DST): UTC+02:00 (CEST)
- Dialling codes: 040
- Vehicle registration: HH

Hamburg-Nord (German pronunciation: [ˈhambʊʁk ˈnɔʁt], "Hamburg North") is one of the seven boroughs of the Free and Hanseatic City of Hamburg, in northern Germany. In 2020, according to the residents registration office, the population was 315,514 in an area of 57.5 km2.

== Geography ==
Starting from the north and continuing on clockwise, Hamburg-Nord borders on the state of Schleswig-Holstein and the Hamburg boroughs of Wandsbek, Mitte, and Eimsbüttel. The borough is divided into 13 localities, namely Alsterdorf, Barmbek-Nord, Barmbek-Süd, Dulsberg, Eppendorf, Fuhlsbüttel, Groß Borstel, Hoheluft-Ost, Hohenfelde, Langenhorn, Ohlsdorf, Uhlenhorst, and Winterhude. Hamburg-Nord has a total area of 57.5 km^{2} (22.2 sq mi).

== Demographics ==
As of 2007, there were 280,229 people residing in the borough. The population density was 4,838 inhabitants per square kilometre (12,530/sq mi). 12% were children under the age of 18 and 17.8% were aged 65 or older.

In 2006, 31,617 criminal offences were committed in the borough (113 crimes per 1000 people).

== Politics ==
Simultaneously with elections to the state parliament (Bürgerschaft), the borough council (Bezirksversammlung) of Hamburg-Nord is elected. It consists of 51 representatives.

The political leader of Hamburg-Nord is the borough manager (Bezirksamtsleiter). From 1949 to 2019, every borough manager (except for Kurt Braasch, who sat 1955 to 1973 for the German Party) has been a member of the SPD. Since 2019 the borough manager is Michael Werner-Boelz (The Greens).

District parliament election of Nord in 2024
Parties	%	±	Seats
Alliance 90/The Greens	27.9	▼7.8	15
Social Democratic Party	23.4	▲2.6	12
Christian Democratic Union	19.3	▲1.8	10
The Left	7.6	▼2.0	4
Free Democratic Party	7.2	▼0.5	4
Alternative for Germany	6.4	▲1.8	3
Volt	6.1	▲6.1	3
Total			51

At the federal level, Hamburg-Nord is split between the Hamburg-Mitte and Hamburg-Nord single-member constituencies for the German parliament.

== Infrastructure and public services ==
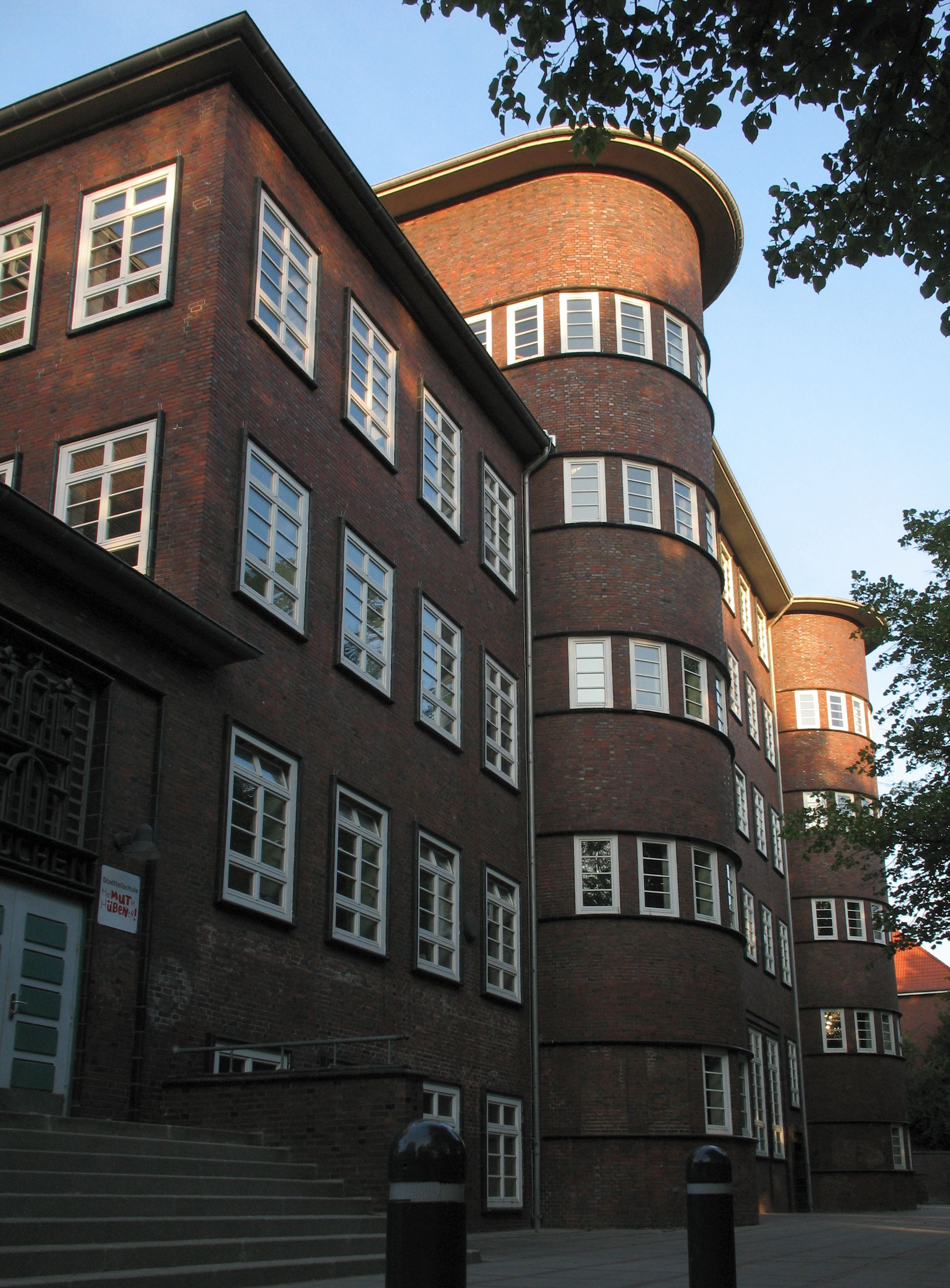
Helmuth Hübener school

The borough has 30 elementary schools and 26 secondary schools.

=== Healthcare systems ===
Several hospitals are located in the borough Hamburg-Nord, among others the University Medical Center Hamburg-Eppendorf (UKE), Martinistr. 52, in the quarter Eppendorf, with 1,369 beds and 109 day-care places in 21 departments. The UKE is a general hospital and teaching hospital for the University of Hamburg and provides the capacity to dispatch emergency medical services. The hospital Asklepios Klinik Nord with its branches Heidberg and Ochsenzoll is located in the quarter Langenhorn. It is a general hospital and provides the capacity to dispatch emergency medical services. The part Ochsenzoll is also specialized for psychiatric problems. The hospital Asklepios Klinik Barmbek is also a general hospital. The Bethanien hospital, Martinistr. 41-49, is specialized for diabetical disease with 20 day-care places for geriatric cases.

There were 154 day-care centers for children and 733 physicians in private practice and 92 pharmacies.

=== Transportation ===
The borough is serviced by the rapid transit system of the underground railway and the city trains with several stations.

There are several exits of the Bundesautobahn 7 in Hamburg-Nord. According to the Department of Motor Vehicles (Kraftfahrt-Bundesamt), in the borough Hamburg-Mitte were 99,440 private cars registered (359 cars/1000 people). There were 1,733 traffic accidents total, including 1,420 traffic accidents with damage to persons.

The Hamburg Airport is located in the quarter Fuhlsbüttel. Hamburg International, a private airline, had its head office in the borough before closing down.

== Sights ==
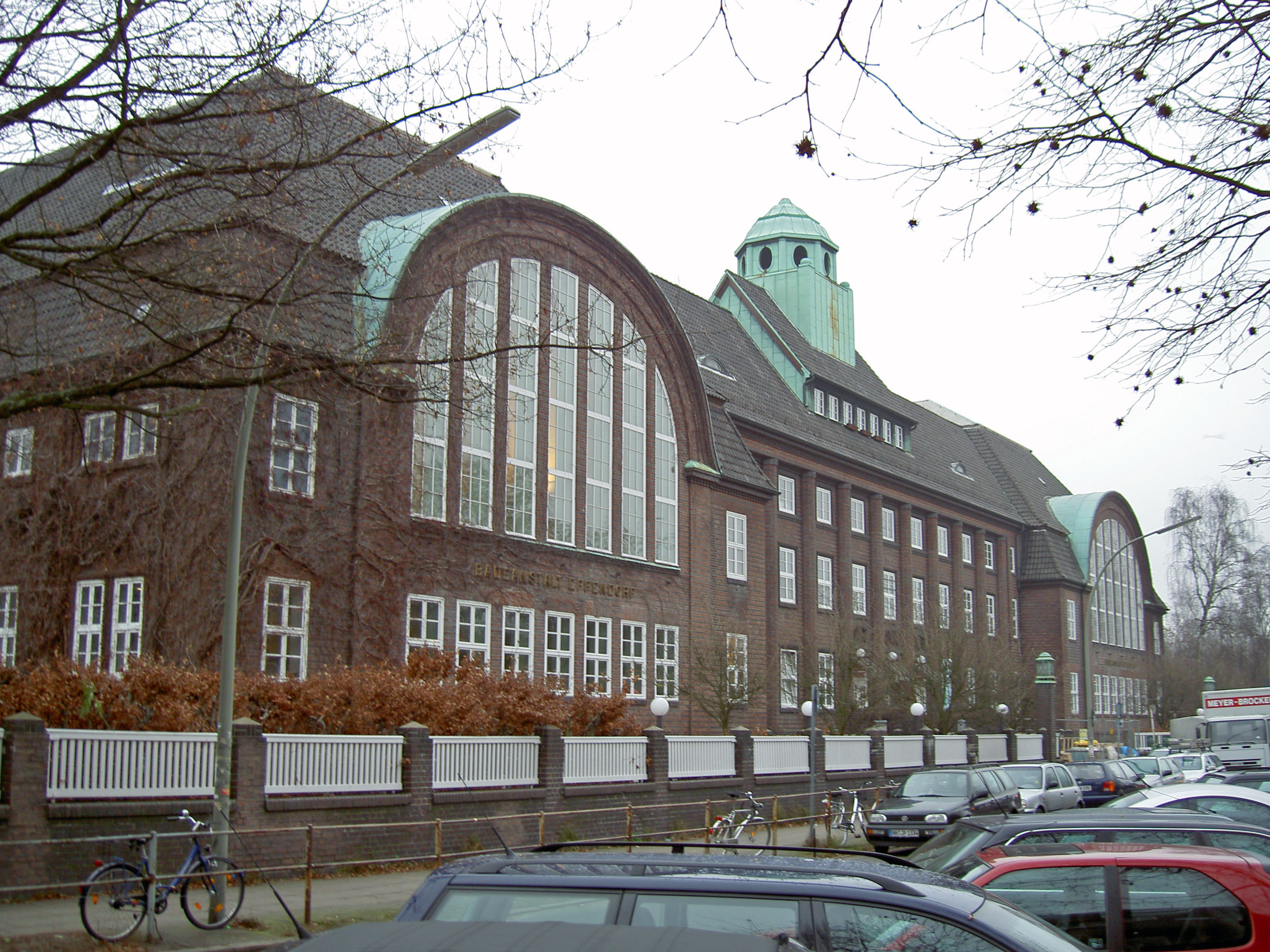
Holthusenbad (a pool) (Quarter Eppendorf).

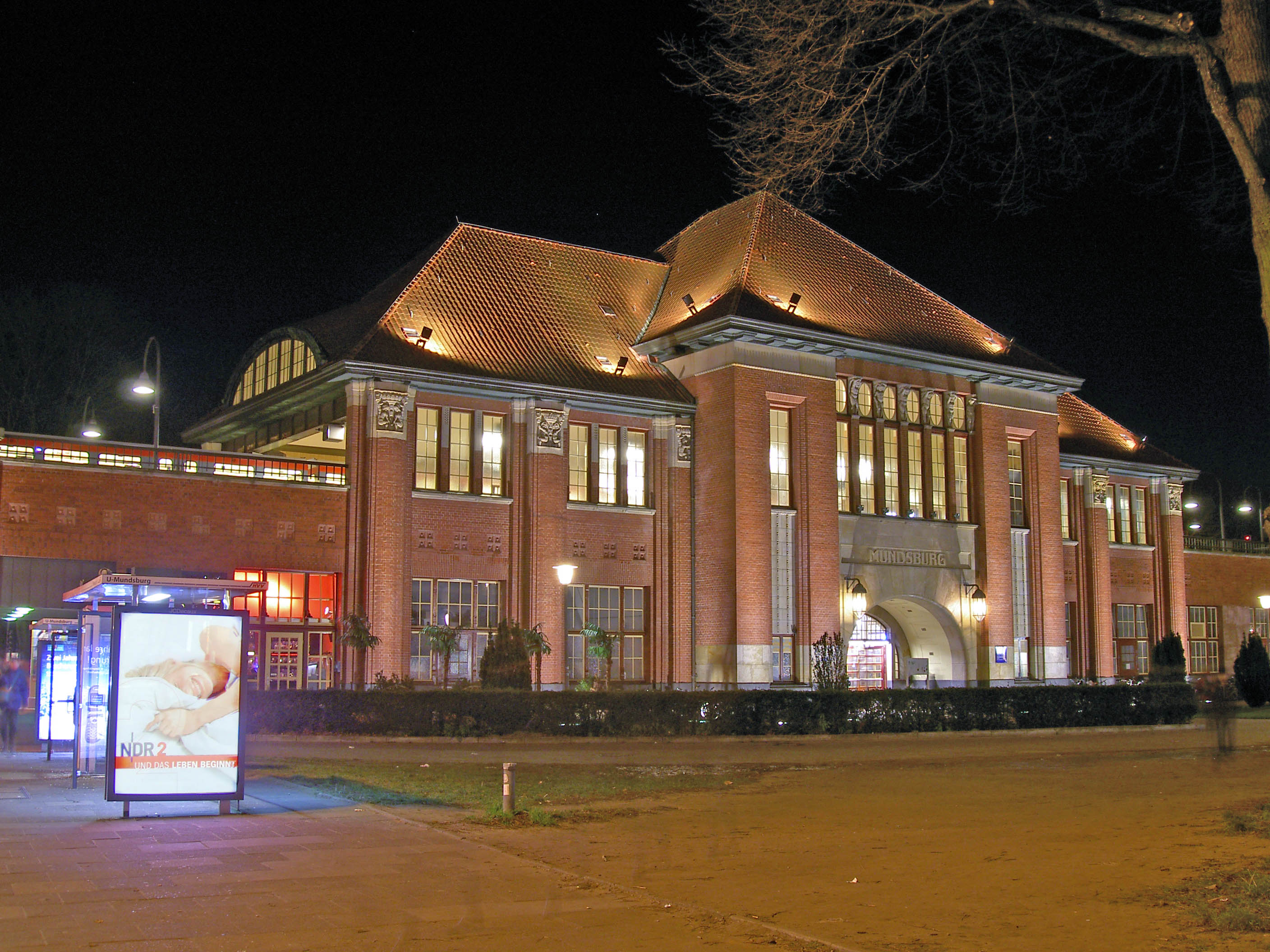
Underground train station Mundsburg (Quarter Uhlenhorst).

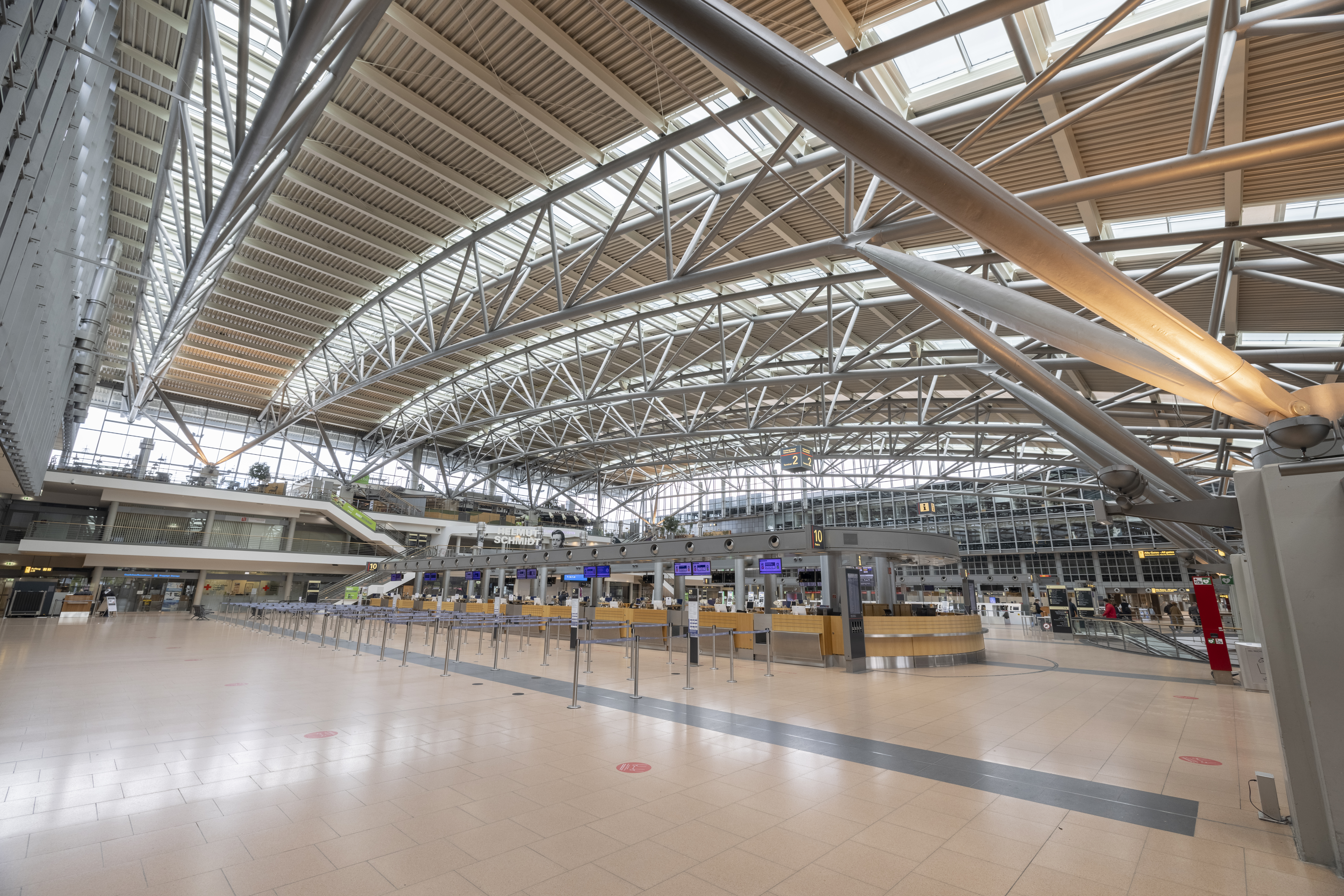
Hamburg Airport, which is in Fuhlsbüttel.

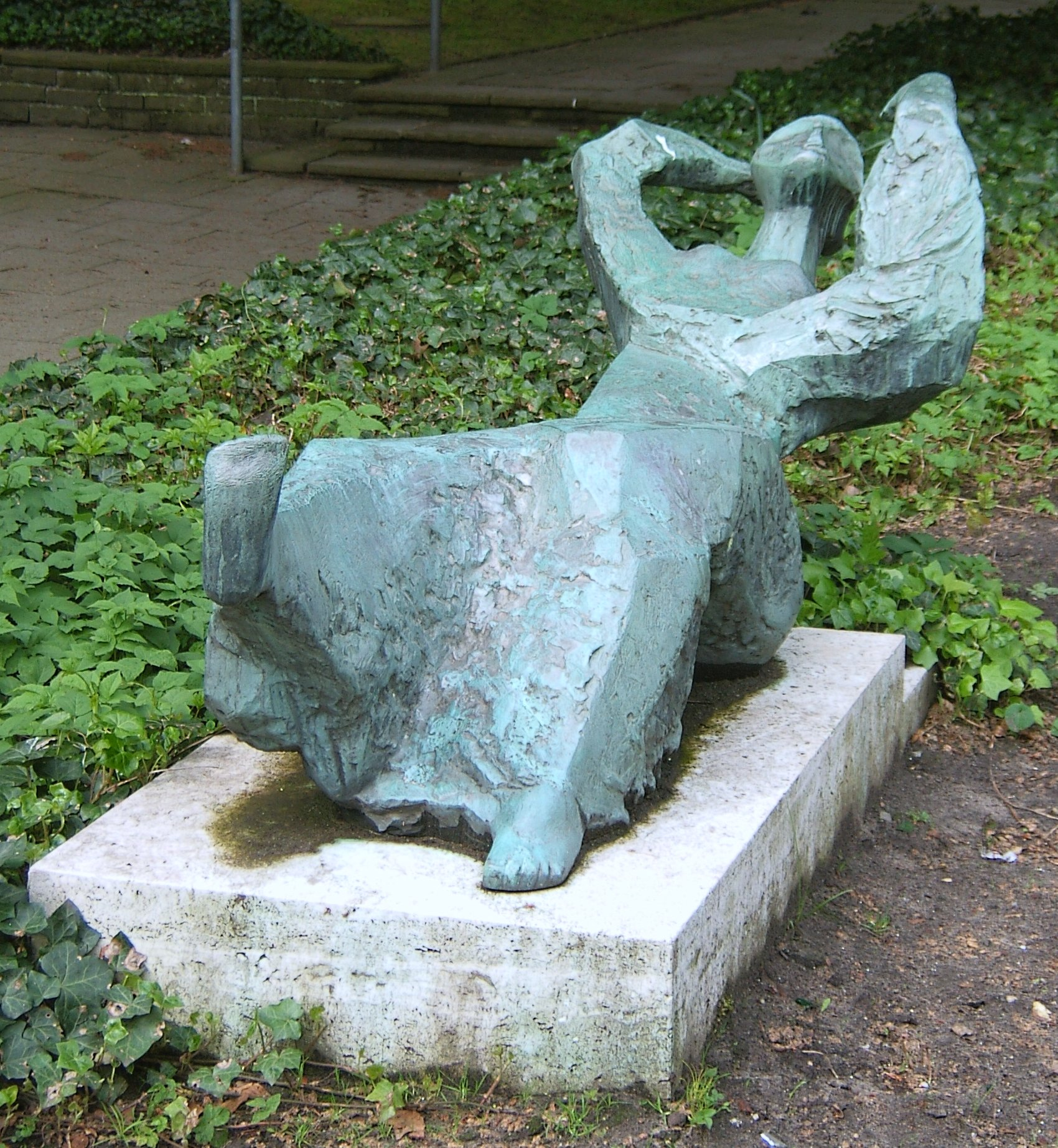
„Die Liegende" (The Woman Lying Down) in front of the borough offices.

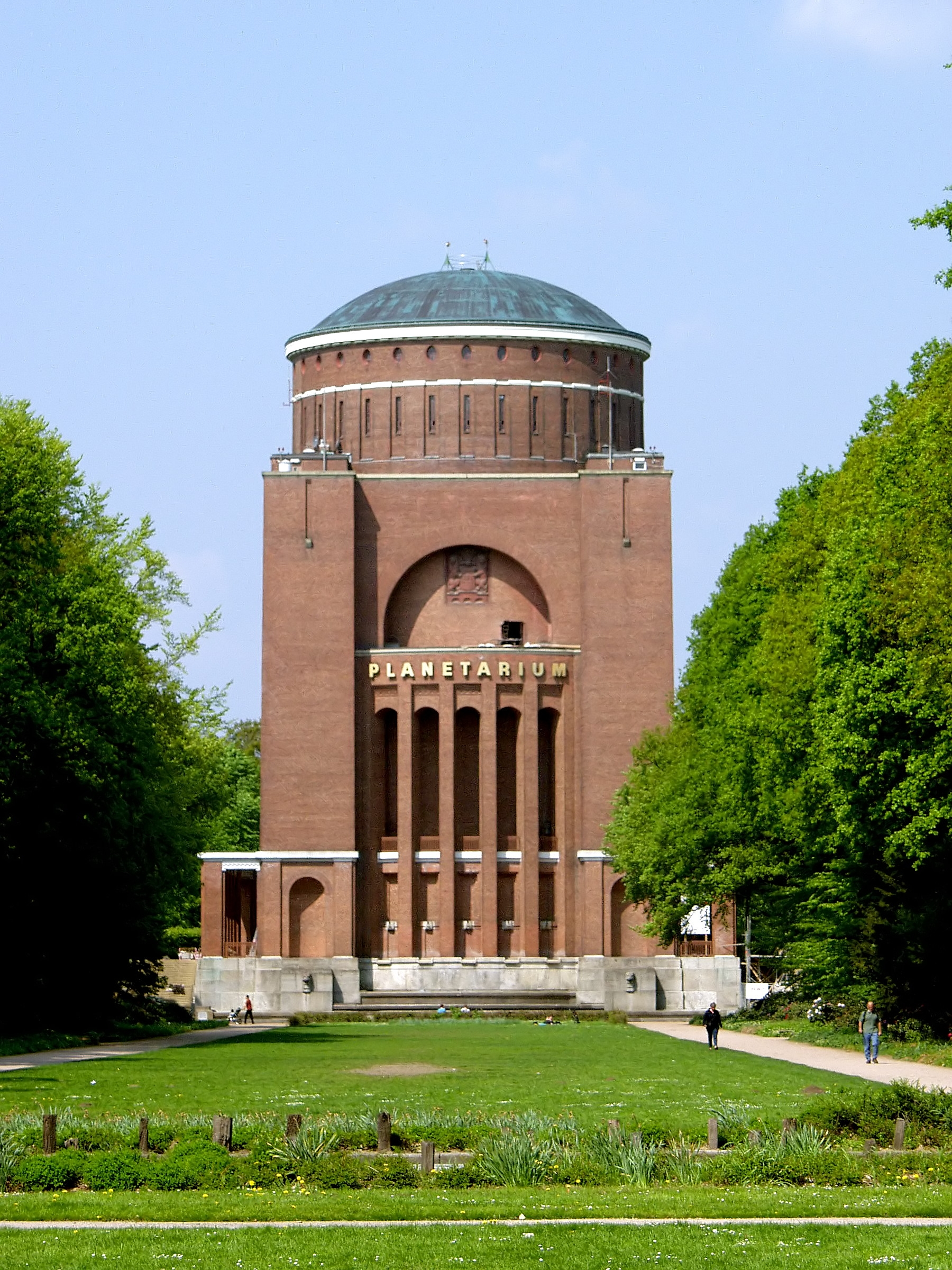
Former water tower now planetarium in the city park.

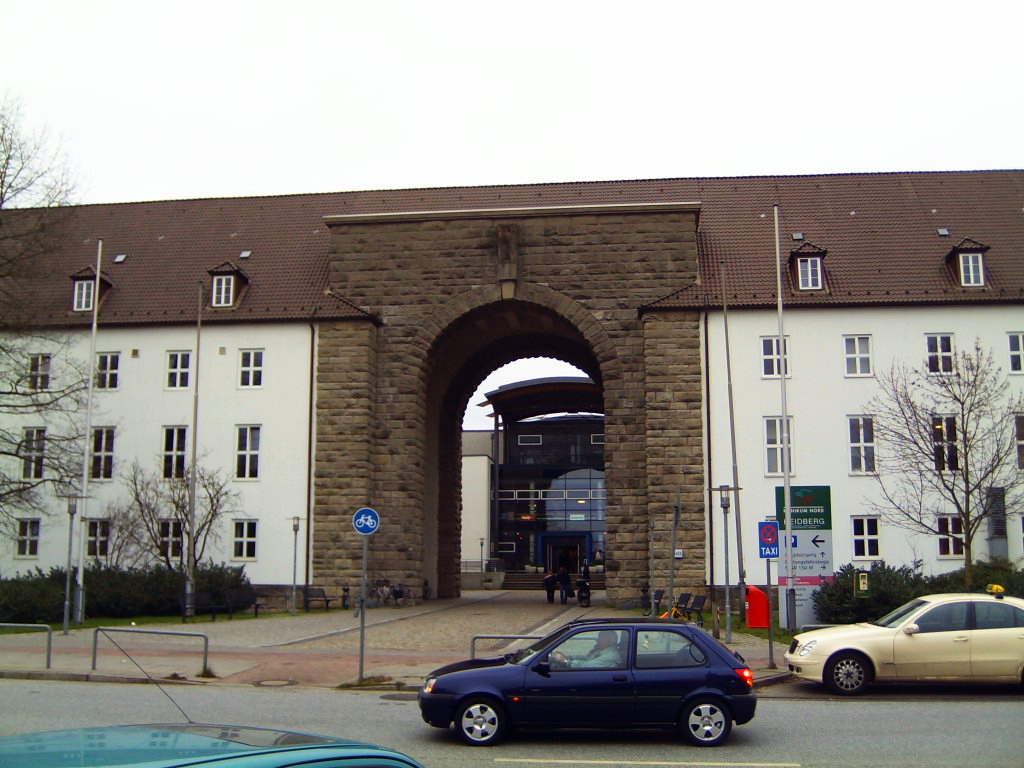
Main entrance of the hospital branch Heidberg in Langenhorn.

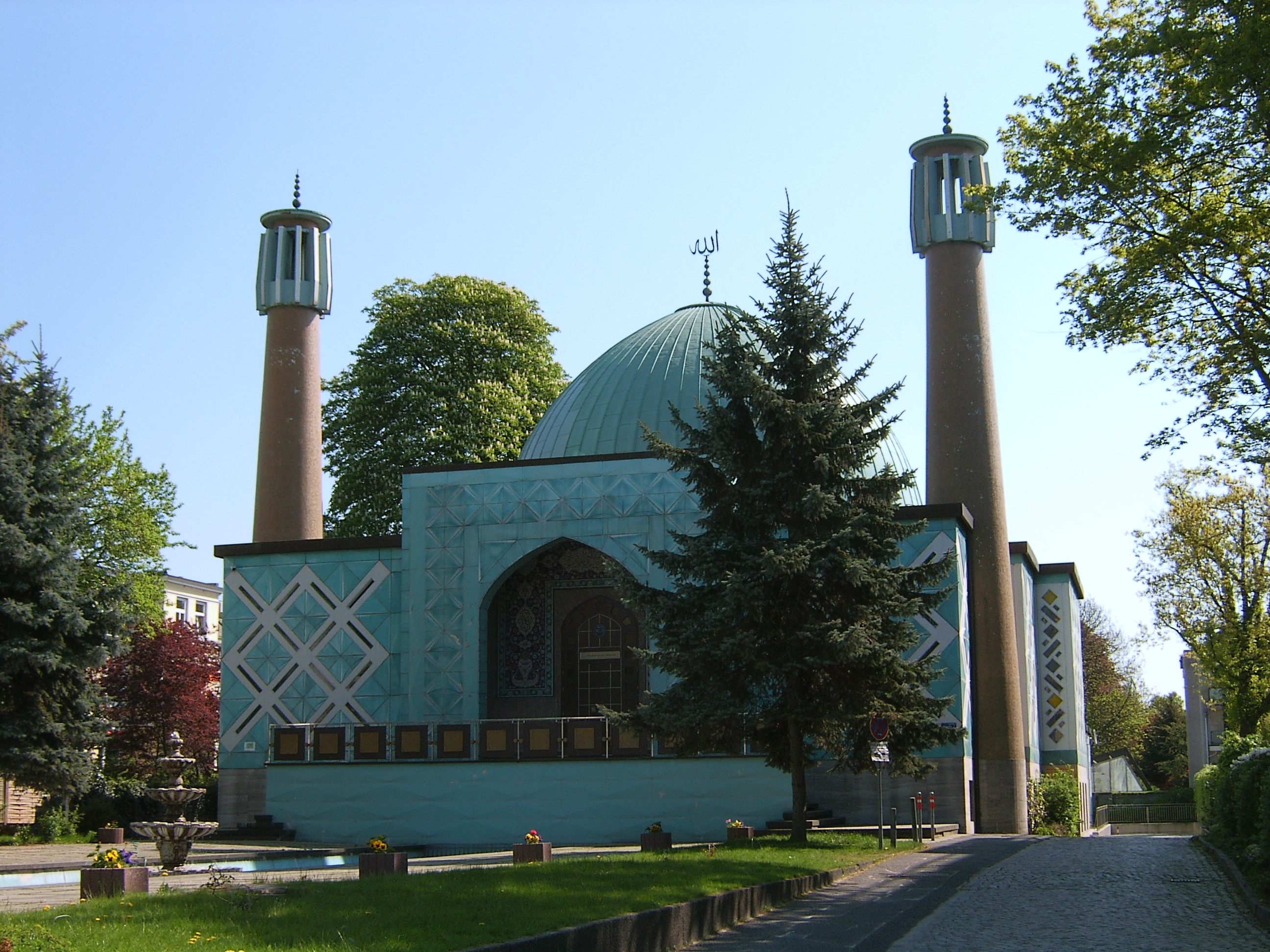
Imam Ali Mosque at the Alster.

== Notes ==
=== References ===
- Statistical office Hamburg and Schleswig-Holstein Statistisches Amt für Hamburg und Schleswig-Holstein, official website (in German)
- Hospitals in Hamburg 2006, Government Agency for Social Affairs, Family Affairs, Health and Environment of Hamburg website (in German)
