= December 1914 =

Month of 1914

<<	December 1914					>>
Su	Mo	Tu	We	Th	Fr	Sa
		1	2	3	4	5
6	7	8	9	10	11	12
13	14	15	16	17	18	19
20	21	22	23	24	25	26
27	28	29	30	31

The following events occurred in December 1914:

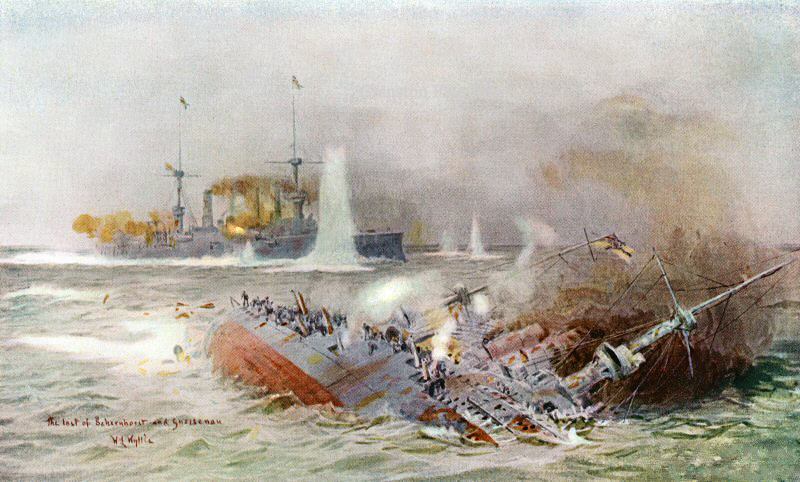
A painting by William Lionel Wyllie of Battle of the Falkland Islands.

== December 1, 1914 (Tuesday) ==
- A colliery accident at a mine in Hokkaido, Japan killed 437 miners.
- Battle of Kolubara — Austro-Hungarian forces occupied Belgrade while the Serbian army withdrew to Niš.
- Battle of Limanowa — The Austro-Hungarian Army attempted to halt further Russian advances into Galicia and prevent the capture of Kraków, resulting in fierce fighting around towns of Limanowa and Łapanów
- Armenian militia in Zeitun, Turkey defeated Ottoman forces after three months of fighting, despite the loss of 60 men. Their actions delayed the Ottoman Empire's plans to uproot the entire Armenian population until March 1915.
- Maritz rebellion — Boer rebel leader Christiaan de Wet was captured by South African forces.
- The South African Irish Regiment for the South African Army was established in Johannesburg.
- Luxury car manufacturer Maserati was founded in Bologna.
- The U1 of the Hamburg U-Bahn line opened in Hamburg with stations at Alsterdorf, Buchenkamp, Hudtwalckerstraße, Lattenkamp, Meiendorfer Weg and Osterstraße.
- The Central Rail Station replaced the Arcade Depot in Los Angeles.
- The daily newspaper Porsgrunns Dagblad was first published in Porsgrunn, Norway.
- Daily newspaper Diario Panorama released its first edition in Maracaibo, Venezuela.
- Born:
  - William Holmes Crosby Jr., American medical researcher, credited as one of the first to develop the field of hematology; in Wheeling, West Virginia, United States (d. 2005)
  - Choo Seng Quee, Singaporean association football player and coach, centre-half for the Singapore national football team from 1936 to 1939, and five-time coach of the team in the 1960s and 1970s; as Joseph Choo Sing Quee, in Singapore, Straits Settlements (present-day Singapore) (d. 1983)
  - Carl W. McIntosh, American academic, 8th president of Montana State University; in Redlands, California, United States (d. 2009)
- Died: Alfred Thayer Mahan, 74, American naval officer, introduced the concept of sea power in The Influence of Sea Power upon History which influenced many naval strategies in the 20th-century; died from heart failure (b. 1840)

== December 2, 1914 (Wednesday) ==
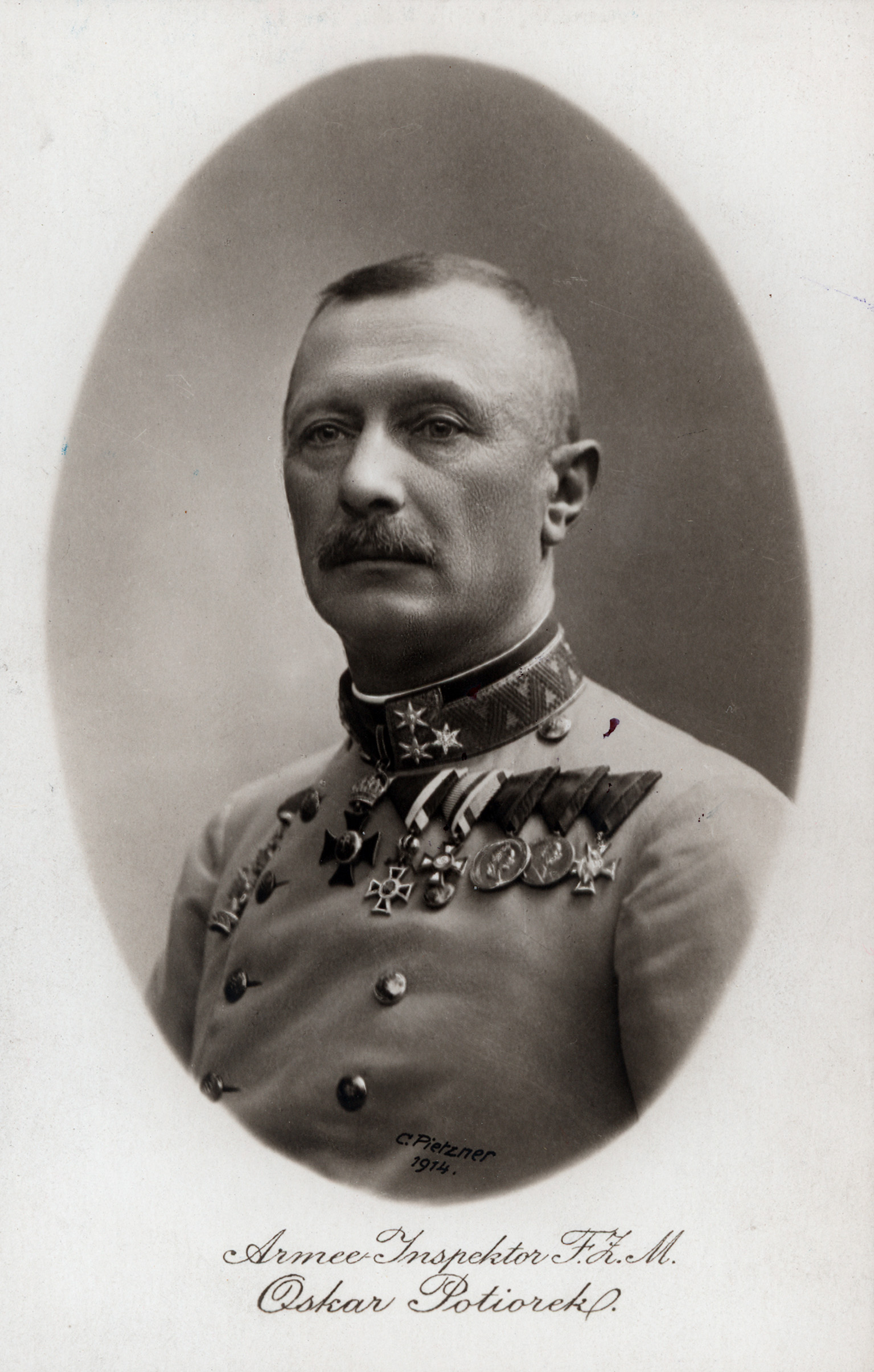
Oskar Potiorek.

- Serbian campaign — In recognition of the occupation of Belgrade happening on the 66th anniversary of the ascension of Franz Joseph to the Austrian throne, army commander Oskar Potiorek informed the emperor that he was "laying town and fortress Belgrade at His Majesty's feet."
- Battle of Kolubara — Serbian forces took advantage of the lull in battle as Austro-Hungarian forces slowly regrouped to resupply and counterattack, with King Peter of Serbia accompanying his nation's army to the front to boost morale.
- The 6th, 8th, and 14th Australian Battalions arrived in Egypt and would participate in the Gallipoli campaign the following April.
- Jimmie Mercer, a county ranger for Pima County, Arizona, was mortally wounded in Pantano, Arizona when a rancher suspected of cattle rustling shot him in the leg before fleeing. Mercer died of his gunshot wound ten days later in a Tucson hospital. Mercer was such a respected lawman and pioneer in southern Arizona that a memorial of him was established at the Ciénega Creek Natural Preserve.
- Born: Adolph Green, American composer, known for musical hits including Singin' in the Rain, On the Town, The Band Wagon, and Hallelujah, Baby!; in New York City, United States (d. 2002)

== December 3, 1914 (Thursday) ==
- Italian Prime Minister Giovanni Giolitti argued in Parliament for Italy to continue remaining neutral during World War I.
- Battle of Qurna — The British Indian Army and forces with the Ottoman Empire clashed at the town of Qurna northwest of Basra, Iraq which had been captured by the British in November. Despite making steady advances on open ground, British soldiers could not find a suitable crossing at the Tigris river and so delayed in assaulting the town directly.
- The 44th Division of the British Army was effectively disbanded while stationed in British India.
- Honor society Omicron Delta Kappa was established at Washington and Lee University.
- William S. Hart made his film debut in The Bargain, becoming the first Western movie star. The film is now preserved by the National Film Registry.

== December 4, 1914 (Friday) ==
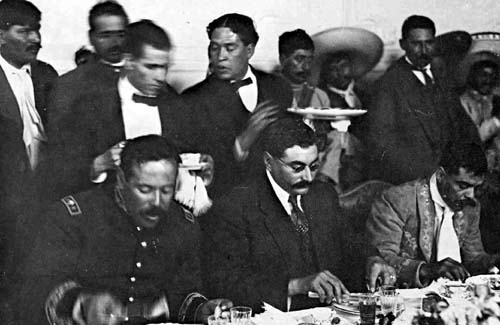
Francisco Villa (left), Eulalio Gutiérrez (center), and Emiliano Zapata (right) at the Mexican National Palace.

- Mexican Revolution — Pancho Villa and Emiliano Zapata met in Xochimilco, Mexico to negotiate an alliance against Venustiano Carranza.
- The Canadian Amateur Hockey Association was established in Ottawa. It merged with Hockey Canada in 1994.
- Born:
  - Claude Renoir, French cinematographer, nephew to film director Jean Renoir, known for his cinematography in The River, Cleopatra, and Barbarella; in Paris, France (d. 1993)
  - Rudolf Hausner, Austrian painter, co-founder of the Vienna School of Fantastic Realism; in Vienna, Austria-Hungary (present-day Austria) (d. 1995)
  - George Swindin, British association football player and manager, 35-year career notable with Arsenal, as goalkeeper from 1936 to 1954 and manager from 1958 to 1962; in Campsall, England (d. 2005)
  - Avelin P. Tacon Jr., American air force pilot, commander of the 123d Airlift Wing during World War II and deputy commander of Twelfth Air Force from 1960 to 1962, recipient of Legion of Merit, Distinguished Flying Cross, Croix de Guerre, and Air Medal; in Mobile, Alabama, United States (d. 2014)

== December 5, 1914 (Saturday) ==
- The caretaker government of Nikola Pašić for Serbia was dissolved in accordance with the Treaty of Niš, allowing Pašić to form a new cabinet.
- Tashi Namgyal became the ruling Chogyal (King) of Sikkim, and the 11th ruler of the Namgyal dynasty after his half-brother and predecessor Sidkeong Tulku Namgyal died suddenly from heart failure after only ruling 10 months. Tashi would rule for several decades, and advocated for closer ties with India, resulting in Sikkim becoming part of the Indian Union in 1975.
- The Irish Volunteers appointed Eoin MacNeill as chief of staff for its main headquarters.
- The Norwegian schooner Endurance, carrying members of the Imperial Trans-Antarctic Expedition led by British explorer Ernest Shackleton, departed after month-long preparations from the British-governed South Georgia Islands in the south Atlantic Ocean and set course for the Antarctic.
- The Toronto Argonauts won their first Grey Cup, defeating the Toronto Varsity Blues 14-2 at Varsity Stadium in Toronto.
- The current Santa Cruz Wharf opened in Santa Cruz, California.
- Born:
  - Lina Bo Bardi, Italian-born Brazilian architect, designer of the São Paulo Museum of Art, advocate for sustainable architecture; as Achillina Bo, in Rome, Kingdom of Italy (present-day Italy) (d. 1992)
  - Edgar Humphreys, British air force officer, member of No. 107 Squadron and the escape party from the German POW camp Stalag Luft III during World War II, in Exmouth, England (executed, 1944)

== December 6, 1914 (Sunday) ==
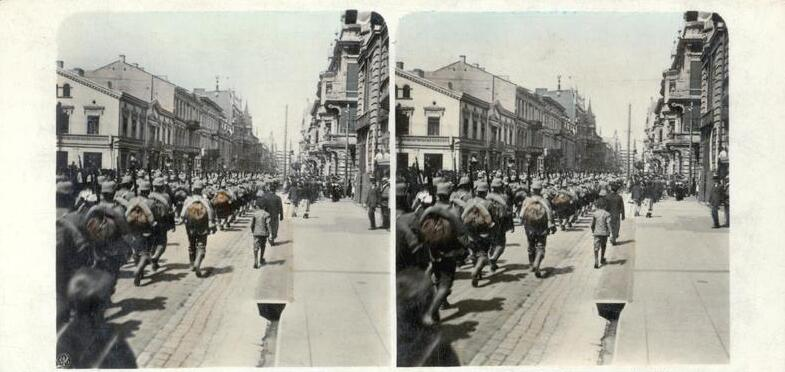
German soldiers enter Łódź, Poland on 6 December 1914.

- Battle of Łódź — German forces occupied Łódź, the second largest city in Poland after Warsaw, effectively ending the battle. German casualties were 35,000, while Russian losses were double at 70,000 along with 25,000 prisoners and 79 captured guns.
- Battle of Kolubara — Serbian forces broke through the Austro-Hungarian line at their center and on their right flank, forcing the invading army to retreat back to Belgrade, abandoning their weapons and equipment as they went.
- Mexican Revolution — Pancho Villa and Emiliano Zapata entered Mexico City at the head of an army of 60,000 men, forcing Venustiano Carranza and his supporters to retreat to Veracruz.
- Battle of Qurna — The British attempted a second assault on Qurna but only ended up retaking ground the Ottomans had moved back into just days before.
- President Adolfo Díaz was elected for a second term following general elections in Nicaragua.
- U.S. naval officer Charles Armijo Woodruff became the 11th Governor of American Samoa, succeeding Nathan Post.
- Mexican revolutionary leader Álvaro Obregón confirmed Pancho Villa had executed Scottish expatriate William S. Benton in February, as part of a 14-point statement to the news media on why he opposed Villa.
- The Fujikoshi railroad opened in Toyama Prefecture, Japan, with stations Fujikoshi, Inarimachi, Minami, and Sagoshi serving the line.
- The village of Broadview, Illinois was established.
- Born:
  - Cyril Washbrook, British cricketer, played for the Lancashire County Cricket Club from 1933 to 1959, including 37 Tests; in Barrow, Lancashire, England (d. 1999)
  - Kou Voravong, Laotian politician, cabinet minister for the Souvanna Phouma administratio; in Khathabouri, French Indochina (present-day Savannakhet, Laos) (d. 1954, assassinated)

== December 7, 1914 (Monday) ==
- The National Assembly of the Kingdom of Serbia publicly released a set of objectives for World War I known as the Niš Declaration, which include a proposal to unify the Balkan nations into Yugoslavia.
- Pope Benedict XV called for an official truce between the warring nations of World War I by Christmas, asking "that the guns may fall silent at least upon the night the angels sang."
- Battle of Kolubara — The Austro-Hungarian Army attempted to regain control around Belgrade by attacking the right flank of the Serbian Army in the city's outskirts.
- The ship Endurance encountered pack ice further north than expected and was forced to maneuver, creating delays for the Imperial Trans-Antarctic Expedition.
- Maritz rebellion — Boer rebel leader General Christian Frederick Beyers drowned in the Vaal River while trying to escape pursuing forces of the Union of South Africa, effectively ending any organized rebellion in South Africa.
- The Supreme Court of the United States rejected a final plea by Leo Frank, sentenced to death for the murder of 13-year old Mary Phagan in Georgia.
- Norwegian cargo ship Nygaard, formerly the SS Belle of Spain, sank in a storm while being towed to Esbjerg, Denmark. All crew had abandoned ship days earlier and were safely transported to port.
- The 44th Indian Brigade of the British Indian Army was established.
- The new building for the Barnes-Jewish Hospital opened on its present site in St. Louis.
- The first feature-length film composed entirely of indigenous North Americans was released as In the Land of the Head Hunters. The film is a fictionalized depiction of Kwakwakaʼwakw (Kwakiutl) peoples that lived in the Queen Charlotte Strait region of British Columbia. The film was written and directed by Edward S. Curtis and acted entirely by members of the Kwakwakaʼwakw. It was an inductee to the National Film Registry list.
- The last film Charlie Chaplin did for Keystone Studios was released; His Prehistoric Past was a prehistoric comedy written and directed by Chaplin. Chaplin had asked for an increase in salary to $1,000 a week ($23,943 in 2016 dollars) when his contract came up for renewal at the end of the year, but Keystone producer Mack Sennett refused for being too large.
- The Grocio Prado District was established in Chincha Province, Peru.
- Born: Winston Place, British cricketer, played for the Lancashire County Cricket Club from 1937 to 1955 and played three Tests in 1948; in Rawtenstall, England (d. 2002)
- Died: Persis Foster Eames Albee, American entrepreneur, considered the first "Avon Lady" of Avon Products, then known as the California Perfume Company (b. 1836)

== December 8, 1914 (Tuesday) ==
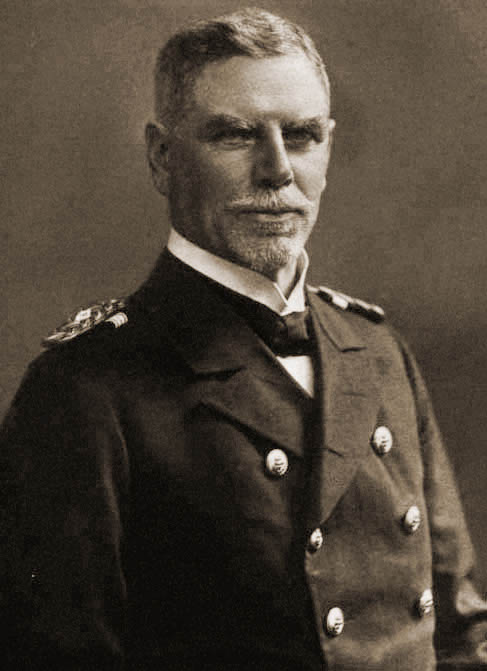
Vice-Admiral Maximilian von Spee.

- Battle of the Falkland Islands — A superior British Royal Navy squadron under Doveton Sturdee located and gave chase to the Imperial German Navy squadron under Admiral Maximilian von Spee while trying to raid a British supply base on the Falkland Islands off Argentina. The British squadron — composed of HMS Invincible and Inflexible, the armoured cruisers HMS Carnarvon, Cornwall and Kent, the armed merchant cruiser HMS Macedonia and the light cruisers HMS Bristol and Glasgow — had superior firepower and were able to sink German cruisers SMS Scharnhorst and Gneisenau, light cruisers SMS Nürnberg and Leipzig, and two auxiliary ships. Only the German light cruiser Dresden cruiser and a third auxiliary escaped. Casualties were incredibly one-sided, with Germany sustaining more than 1,800 casualties, including Admiral von Spee, while the British sustained only a dozen.
- Battle of Kolubara — Serbian forces attacked the Austro-Hungarian Army before they could fall back and entrench themselves in the towns of Užice and Valjevo in western Serbia. Using the hills surrounding Valjevo, the Serbs were able to encircle the town and storm Austro-Hungarian defenses before they were all properly set up and capture the city with minimal casualties. In four days of counterattacks, the Serbian army captured more than 20,000 troops, 50 officers including a general, and 40 cannons as well as huge stocks of military equipment.
- Battle of Qurna — The British located a suitable crossing on the Tigris river to ensure Ottoman forces could not retake gained ground, while a British gunboat managed to capture an Ottoman steamer.
- U.S. President Woodrow Wilson delivered his State of the Union Address to both houses of the United States Congress, advocating the hopes of peace and growth of international trade and cooperation, in spite of ongoing events with World War I.
- The No. 9 Squadron for the Royal Flying Corps was established.
- The War Merit Cross was created by Prince Leopold to recognize significant contributions to the German war effort during World War I by military and civilians alike. Before being discontinued in 1918, it had been awarded 18,000 times to combatants and 1,100 times to civilians.
- The Cathedral Preparatory School and Seminary was established as a private Catholic high school in Elmhurst, Queens, New York City.
- The Mayfair Theatre opened in Dunedin, New Zealand.
- The musical Watch Your Step, with music and lyrics by Irving Berlin, premiered at the New Amsterdam Theatre in New York City and ran for 175 performances.
- Born: Ernie Toshack, Australian cricketer, played 12 Tests for the Australia national cricket team from 1946 to 1948; as Ernest Toshack, in Cobar, Australia (d. 2003)
- Died: William Woodville Rockhill, 60, American diplomat, most known for developing the Open Door Policy for China (b. 1854)

== December 9, 1914 (Wednesday) ==
- Battle of Kolubara — The Austro-Hungarian counter-offensive around Belgrade failed and forces retreated towards the city centre.
- Battle of Qurna — With British now able to cross the river, the Ottoman command negotiated a surrender that would allow the troops to leave the town of Qurna in exchange for handing it over to the British. However, British command ordered an unconditional surrender that the Ottomans reluctantly accepted, leading to 42 Ottoman officers and 989 soldiers to be taken prisoner. The British losses were 29 killed and 242 wounded.
- German submarine U-11 struck a mine off the coast of Belgium and sank, killing all 26 crew on board.
- The first Hillsboro Public Library, funded by Andrew Carnegie, opened in Hillsboro, Oregon.
- South Australian Railways opened the Robertstown railway line from Eudunda to Robertstown, South Australia, Australia.
- The notorious British softcore porn magazine Photo Bits released its final issue, but already gained its reputation in literary circles, most famously for being mentioned in James Joyce's novel Ulysses. The magazine was famous for being one of Britain's most popular pin-up magazines even as it was also the most maligned by moral leaders.
- Born:
  - Frances Reid, American actress, known for role of Alice Horton on the NBC daytime soap opera Days of Our Lives from 1965 to 2007; in Wichita Falls, Texas, United States (d. 2010)
  - Gordon Kidder, Canadian air force officer, member of the No. 156 Squadron and of the escape team from the German POW camp Stalag Luft III during World War II; in St. Catharines, Ontario, Canada (executed, 1944)
  - Max Manus, Norwegian resistance fighter, member of Norwegian Independent Company 1 during German occupation of Norway during World War II, recipient of the Distinguished Service Order, Military Cross, Medal of Freedom, Defence Medal and War Cross; as Maximo Guillermo Manus, in Bergen, Norway (d. 1996)
- Died: Mitchell Cary Alford, 59, American politician, 25th Lieutenant Governor of Kentucky (b. 1855)

== December 10, 1914 (Thursday) ==
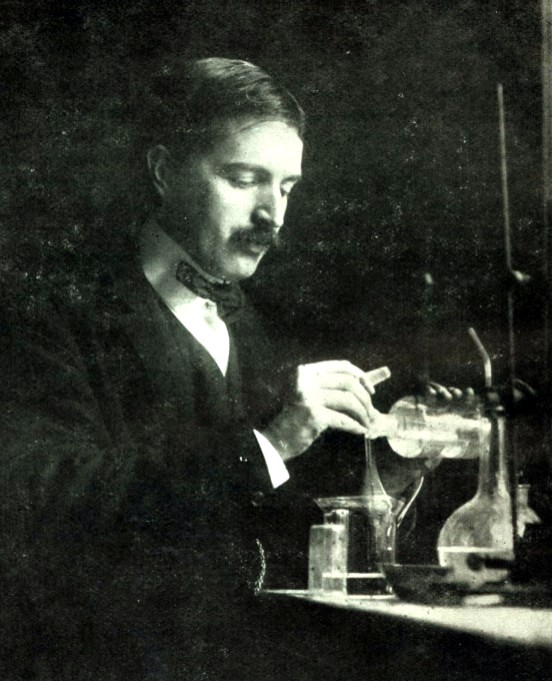
Theodore William Richards, first American Nobel Prize winner.

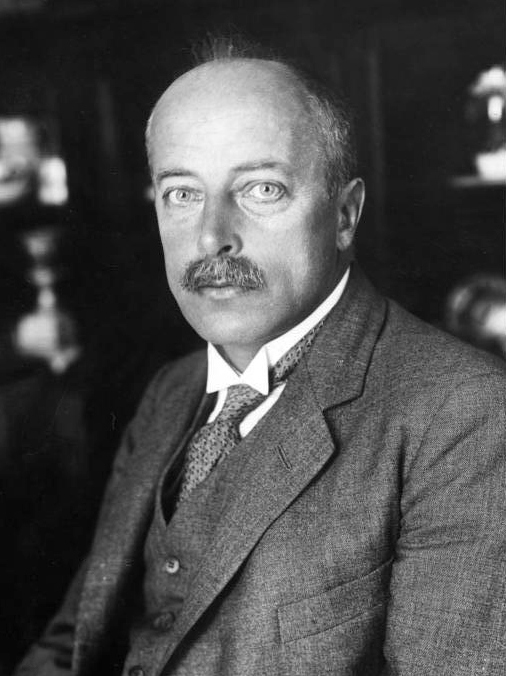
Physicist Max von Laue, Nobel Prize winner.

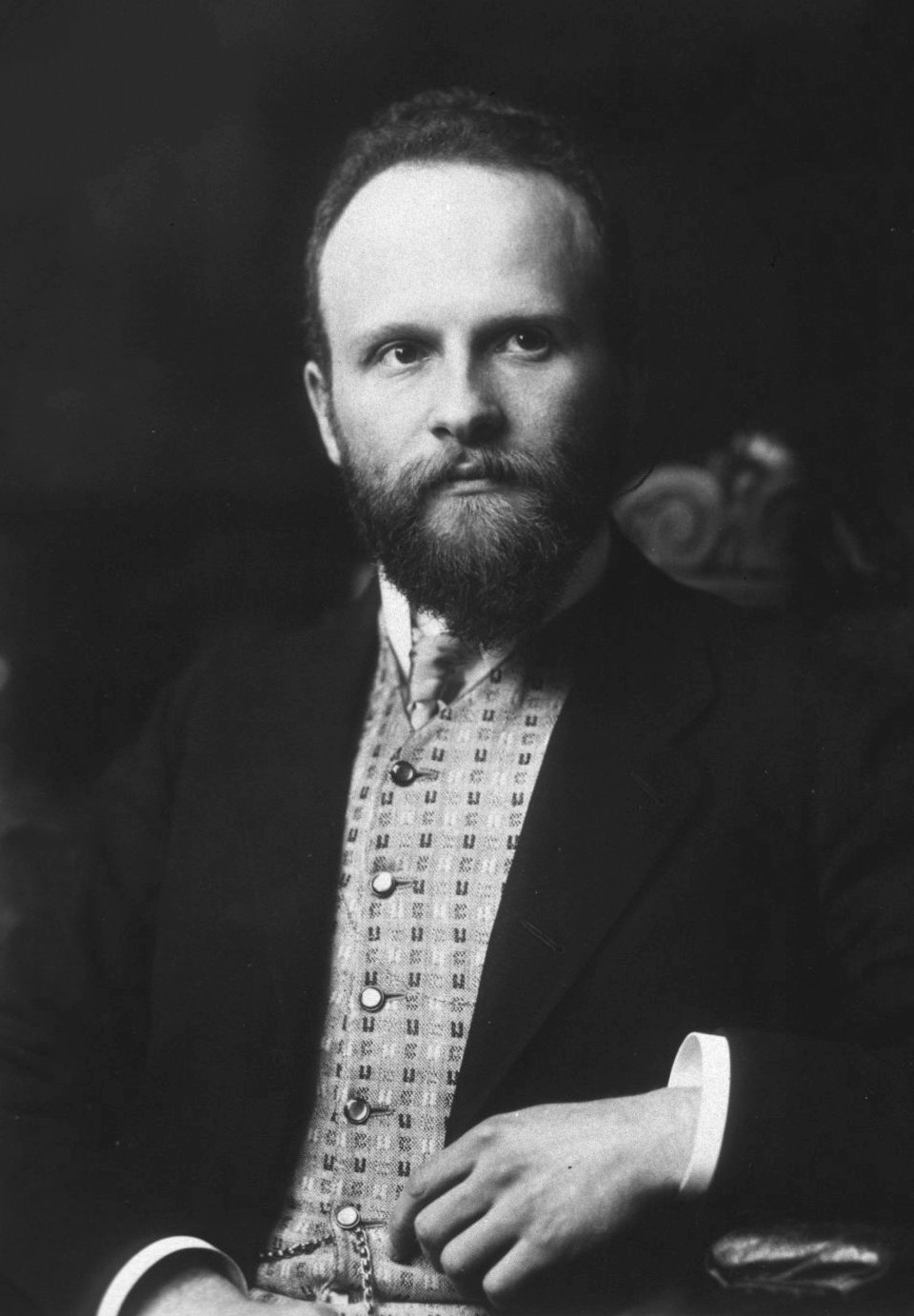
Medical researcher Róbert Bárány, Nobel Prize winner.

- The Nobel Prize Committee selected German physicist Max von Laue as recipient for the Nobel Prize in Physics, American chemist Theodore William Richards for the Nobel Prize in Chemistry (the first time an American scientist was a recipient), and Austro-Hungarian physiologist Róbert Bárány for the Nobel Prize in Medicine.
- New Zealand held a general election to elect a total 80 Members of Parliament for the 19th New Zealand Parliament, with incumbent Prime Minister William Massey of the Reform Government maintaining power. Over 600,000 voters were registered, of which 84 per cent turned out to vote.
- Battle of Kolubara — The Serbian Army retook the lower reaches of the Drina, forcing most of the Austro-Hungarian troops to retreat across the river back towards Bosnia.
- The Royal Navy's first aircraft carrier, HMS Ark Royal, was commissioned.
- Norwegian ferry Hydro to serve Lake Tinnsjå in Norway as part of the Tinnsjø railway ferry service.
- The Maine State Nurses Association was established in Portland, Maine.
- The suspenseful drama The Man Who Stayed at Home by J. E. Harold Terry premiered at the Royalty Theatre in London and became a major hit on the eve of World War I, running 584 in at the time was one of the longest-running hit plays in British theater.
- Born:
  - Dorothy Lamour, American actress and singer, guest starred with Bing Crosby and Bob Hope on many of the Road to ... movies; as Mary Leta Dorothy Slaton, in New Orleans, United States (d. 1996)
  - John Pohe, New Zealand air force officer, member of the No. 51 Squadron and escape team from the German POW camp Stalag Luft III during World War II; as Porokoru Patapu Pohe, in Whanganui, New Zealand (executed, 1944)
- Died: Joseph Smith III, 82, American religious leader, eldest son of Joseph Smith, founder of Mormonism, President of the Church from 1860 to 1914 (b. 1832)

== December 11, 1914 (Friday) ==
- Winston Churchill, First Lord of the Admiralty, formally declared Allied victory had been achieved in the Pacific.
- Benito Mussolini merged his Fascist organization Fasci Autonomi d'Azione Rivoluzionaria with Fasci d'Azione Internazionalista to become Fasci d'Azione Rivoluzionaria (renamed later as Fasci Italiani di Combattimento), with Mussolini as the organization's leader.

== December 12, 1914 (Saturday) ==
- The New York Stock Exchange re-opened, having been closed since August 1 except for bond trading.
- The I and II Indian Brigades were formed out of the older VIII Brigade of the Royal Horse Artillery.
- The Football Battalion was established to provide football games for the British troops during World War I.
- The American Association of State Highway and Transportation Officials was established as the American Association of State Highway Officials to set standards for highway design and construction throughout the United States (it changed to its present name in 1973).
- The rail line between Chur and Arosa, Switzerland began operating, with stations Arosa, Chur Altstadt, Langwies, Litzirüti, Lüen-Castiel, Peist, Sankt Peter-Molinis, and Sassal serving the line. The Castielertobel, Gründjitobel, and Langwieser bridges were completed and opened along the rail.
- A fire destroyed the famed International Hotel in Virginia City, Nevada. Ironically, it was the second hotel after the original burned down in 1875.
- Jefferson County, Oregon was established with its county seat in Madras.
- Born:
  - Patrick O'Brian, British novelist, author of the Aubrey–Maturin series, starting with Master and Commander; as Richard Patrick Russ, in Chalfont St Peter, England (d. 2000)
  - Tom Kelley, American photographer, photographed various celebrities from Gary Cooper to John F. Kennedy, but most famous for his 1949 nude photos of Marilyn Monroe; in Philadelphia, United States (d. 1984)
  - Buzzie Bavasi, American sports executive, general manager of the Brooklyn and Los Angeles Dodgers from 1951 to 1968; as Emil Joseph Bavasi, in New York City, United States (d. 2008)

== December 13, 1914 (Sunday) ==
- Battle of Limanowa — The Austro-Hungarian Army successfully beat back all Russian attacks but casualties proved massive. Austro-Hungarian and supporting German forces sustained 12,000 casualties, while the Imperial Russian Army suffered 30,000 casualties.
- Battle of Kolubara — With most of the rest of the Austro-Hungarian Army pushed out of Serbia, General Oskar Potiorek ordered the remaining Austro-Hungarian forces in Belgrade to withdraw from the city.
- British submarine HMS B11 torpedoed the Ottoman ironclad Mesudiye in the Dardanelles, killing 37 sailors and officers. However, the ship's 150 mm guns were salvaged and rebuilt as defensive guns on the shores of the straits.
- The new Nordlandet Church was consecrated in the Kristiansund, Norway.
- Born:
  - Alan Bullock, British historian, leading expert on Nazism, author of Hitler: A Study in Tyranny; in Trowbridge, England (d. 2004)
  - Larry Parks, American actor, best known for portraying Al Jolson in The Jolson Story and Jolson Sings Again; as Samuel Lawrence Klusman Parks, in Olathe, Kansas, United States (d. 1975)

== December 14, 1914 (Monday) ==
- Battle of Kolubara — Austro-Hungarian forces began to evacuate out of Belgrade.
- Battle of Givenchy — France launched a winter offensive against the Germans with support from the British Expeditionary Force in the regions of Flanders and Artois in west Belgium.
- Municipal elections were held in Edmonton, Alberta, with just over 10,000 ballots cast out of 32,000 eligible voters, for a voter turnout of 31%. William Thomas Henry was elected 13th Mayor of Edmonton, beating challenger Joseph Adair in a landslide of over 8,000 votes to 1,600.
- A Royal Naval Air Service Avro 504 of the Eastchurch Squadron dropped four 16-lb (7.25-kg) bombs on the Ostend-Bruges railway in Belgium.
- A freighter responded to a rendezvous request by German naval officer Hellmuth von Mücke, leader of the 50-man landing party for the SMS Emden that was stranded on Cocos Islands in the Indian Ocean after their ship was damaged and grounded by the Australian cruiser HMAS Sydney. The crew commandeered a schooner to the Dutch East Indies but could not remain there without violating the Netherlands neutrality during World War I. The freighter picked up the landing party and delivered them to the Ottoman port city of Hodeida (now Al Hudaydah in Yemen).
- The ship Endurance encountered thick ice in the Weddell Sea, creating constant delays to the Imperial Trans-Antarctic Expedition. Shackleton later wrote in memoirs: "I had been prepared for evil conditions in the Weddell Sea, but had hoped that the pack would be loose. What we were encountering was fairly dense pack of a very obstinate character."
- Canadian chartered Bank of Vancouver closed its doors after only four years, a victim of the sudden collapse of the real estate market and industry in Vancouver due by the onset of World War I.
- A film adaptation of The Last Egyptian by Land of Oz creator L. Frank Baum was released, starring J. Farrell MacDonald in the title role (who was also director).
- Born:
  - Karl Carstens, German politician, 12th President of Germany; in Bremen, German Empire (present-day Germany) (d. 1992)
  - Jack Cole, American comic book artist, creator of Plastic Man; in New Castle, Pennsylvania, United States (d. 1958)

== December 15, 1914 (Tuesday) ==
- Battle of Kolubara — The Serbian Army took back control of Belgrade, effectively ending the battle.
- A gas explosion at the Mitsubishi Hōjō mine in Kyushu, Japan killed 687 miners, the worst coal mine disaster in Japanese history.
- Ross Sea party — British polar ship Aurora left Sydney for Hobart, Tasmania, Australia. The ship was a component of the Imperial Trans-Antarctic Expedition under command of Aeneas Mackintosh that was to lay out a series of supply depots across the Ross Ice Shelf in the Antarctic for polar expedition under command of Ernest Shackleton.
- The International Exhibition of Marine and Maritime Hygiene officially closed in Genoa after a seven-month showing of Italian influence in its colonies.
- The Iwate Light Railway opened new stations in the Iwate Prefecture, Japan, including Ayaori, Iwanebashi, and Futsukamachi.
- Died: Martin Schanz, 72, German academic, leading scholar on Plato and classical philosophy at the University of Würzburg (b. 1842)
- Died: Len Spencer, pioneer recording artist dies aged 47 in New York City.

== December 16, 1914 (Wednesday) ==
- The Battle of Kolubara officially ended in a decisive victory for Serbia. The Austro-Hungarian Army suffered about 225,000 casualties, including 30,000 killed, 173,000 wounded and 70,000 taken prisoner, including 200 officers, as well as the loss of 130 cannons, 70 heavy machine-guns and large stocks of military supplies. The Serbian army suffered heavy casualties, with 22,000 killed, 91,000 wounded and 19,000 missing or captured.
- Raid on Scarborough, Hartlepool and Whitby — Imperial German Navy battle cruisers attacked English North Sea ports, resulting in 137 deaths.
- The British cruiser HMS Comus was launched by Swan Hunter at Wallsend, England, and would be involved in the Battle of Jutland in 1916.
- SMS Glyndwr was the first Imperial German Navy aviation ship to be commissioned. She served initially as a seaplane pilot training ship.
- The Iida railroad was extended into Nagano Prefecture, Japan with stations Ina-Fukuoka, Komachiya, Akaho, and Ōtagiri serving it.

== December 17, 1914 (Thursday) ==
- The Ottoman Empire made known to Germany it had signed a secret alliance with Bulgaria back in August.
- First Battle of Artois — The first major offensive on the Western Front since the First Battle of Ypres commenced with French forces attacking German defenses from Artois, France.
- U.S. President Woodrow Wilson signed the Harrison Narcotics Tax Act, that was initially introduced by U.S. Representative Francis Burton Harrison.
- George Johnson Clarke became Premier of New Brunswick, replacing James Kidd Flemming who resigned following a scandal concerning fundraising practices.
- The British cruiser HMS Calliope was launched at Chatham, Kent and would serve at the Battle of Jutland in 1916.
- South Australian Railways opened the Milang railway line from Milang to Sandergrove, South Australia, Australia.
- Born: Raymond Fernandez, American serial killer, believed to have killed 20 women from 1947 to 1949 with wife Martha Beck; in Territory of Hawaii, United States (present-day Hawaii, U.S.) (executed, 1951)

== December 18, 1914 (Friday) ==
- The Sultanate of Egypt became a British protectorate.
- Battle of Givenchy — Offensive operations were halted due to bad weather, entrenched German defenses and lack of objectives reached.
- Battle of Rufiji Delta — German cruiser SMS Königsberg moved further up Rufiji River in German East Africa to avoid barrages from a British naval squadron.
- A German colonial force of 2,000 men assaulted the town of Naulila, Portuguese Angola where Portuguese troops were garrisoned, the largest battle in of the German campaign in Angola. The attack forced the Portuguese to abandon the town with 69 dead, 76 wounded and 79 taken prisoner. The Germans only lost a dozen men killed and another 30 wounded. German forces would occupy much of Angola until the following year.
- German submarine SM U-5 sank off the coast of Belgium following an accident, killing all 29 crew members.
- The Indian Cavalry Corps was established for service on the Western Front.
- A meeting was held in Stellenbosch, South Africa to discuss the creation of a national newspaper for the country.
- Born: Phil H. Bucklew, American naval officer, commander with the United States Navy SEALs during World War II; in Columbus, Ohio, United States (d. 1992)

== December 19, 1914 (Saturday) ==
- Royal Australian Navy destroyer Huon was launched from the Cockatoo Island Dockyard in Sydney.
- The 1st and 2nd Brigades of the Polish Legions were established.
- Mohandas Gandhi left England sailing for India, accompanied by his wife Kasturba. He began to learn the Bengali language while on board.
- Born: James Peck, American activist, promoter of nonviolent resistance in the United States, participant in the Journey of Reconciliation and member of the Freedom Riders; in New York City, United States (d. 1993)
- Died: Lee McClung, 44, American public servant, 22nd Treasurer of the United States; died from typhoid fever (b. 1870)

== December 20, 1914 (Sunday) ==
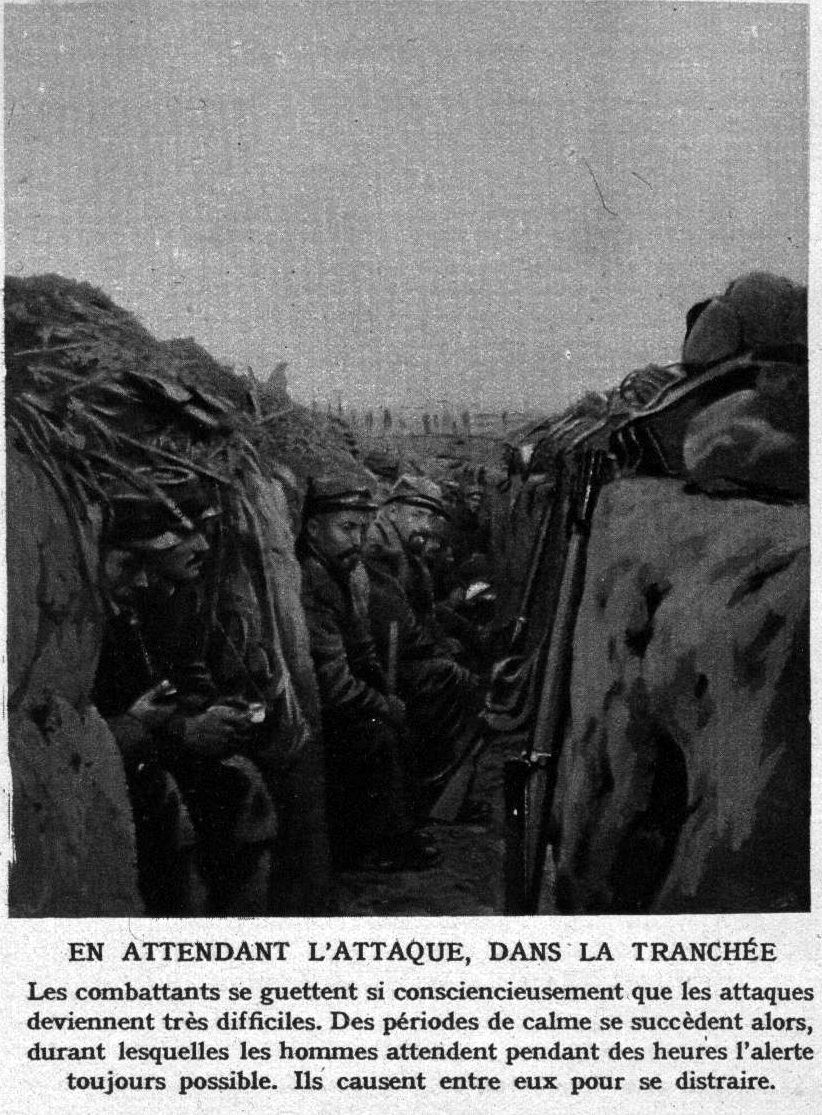
"Waiting for the attack, in the trench," French news photo of soldiers waiting to attack during the First Battle of Champagne.

- First Battle of Champagne — The French Fourth Army launched attacks from Artois and Champagne-Ardenne in France in hopes of breaking through and forcing a German retreat.
- Battle of Givenchy — German forces attacked members of the British Indian Army defending Givenchy, France, capturing defense trenches on either side of the town.
- During a massive gale in Dover harbor, British ocean liner SS Montrose broke free of its moorings and drifted out to sea before it was wrecked on the Goodwin Sands offshore.
- The French submarine Curie was spotted by patrolling Austro-Hungarian Navy ships near Pula, Croatia. She was then hit and sunk, killing three sailors while the remaining crew of 23 were captured. Being in shallow water, the submarine was salvaged and later re-outfitted as SM U-14, serving under the Central Powers for the remainder of World War I. It was returned to the French Navy in 1919.
- Ross Sea party — British polar ship Aurora arrived at Hobart, Tasmania, Australia to take on final stores before journeying to the Antarctic where it would lay out supply depots for the main Imperial Trans-Antarctic Expedition.
- The Keihin–Tōhoku Line opened in Japan, with stations Shinagawa, Takashimachō and Tokyo serving the line.
- The Anderson County Courthouse in Palestine, Texas was dedicated. It was added to the National Register of Historic Places in 1992.
- Born:
  - Harry F. Byrd Jr., American politician, U.S. Senator from Virginia from 1965 till 1983; in Winchester, Virginia, United States (d. 2013)
  - Mary Helen Wright Greuter, American astronomer and historian, author of Explorer of the Universe: A Biography of George Ellery Hale (1966) and Sweeper of the Sky: The Life of Maria Mitchell (1949); as Mary Helen Wright, in Washington, D.C., United States (d. 1997)
  - Adrian von Fölkersam, German army officer, member of the Waffen-SS during World War II, recipient of Knight's Cross of the Iron Cross; in Petrograd, Russian Empire (present-day Saint Petersburg, Russia) (d. 1945, killed in action)

== December 21, 1914 (Monday) ==
- First Battle of Champagne — After gaining some ground, French forces found German defenses were stronger than anticipated, with machine gun nests and mines slowing their advance.
- Battle of Givenchy — German forces launched a direct assault on Givenchy, France but French and British reinforcements saved the town from capture.
- Lieutenant-General Sir William Birdwood arrived in Egypt to take command of the Australian and New Zealand Army Corps.
- Great Britain was bombed by German aircraft for the first time, when an Etrich Taube dropped two bombs near the Admiralty Pier in Dover.
- Royal Naval Air Service Wing Commander Charles Rumney Samson conducted the first night bombing raid, attacking Ostend, Belgium flying a Maurice Farman biplane.
- The Mack Sennett comedy Tillie's Punctured Romance, which featured Marie Dressler, Mabel Normand, Charlie Chaplin and the Keystone Cops, was the first feature-length film released through Keystone Studios. Considered to be the first feature-length comedy ever released, the film, based on the Broadway play Tillie's Nightmare starring Dressler, became so popular that three other films featuring Dressler as the Tillie character were made.
- Born:
  - Frank Fenner, Australian medical researcher, oversaw programs that eradicated smallpox and controlled the rabbit populations in Australia; in Ballarat, Australia (d. 2010)
  - Theodor Weissenberger, German air force officer, commander of Jagdgeschwader 5 and Jagdgeschwader 7 for the Luftwaffe during World War II, recipient of the Knight's Cross of the Iron Cross; in Mühlheim am Main, German Empire (present-day Germany) (killed in vehicle accident, 1950)
- Died: William Montgomery, 93, New Zealand politician, Member of the New Zealand Legislative Council from 1892 to 1906 (b. 1821)

== December 22, 1914 (Tuesday) ==
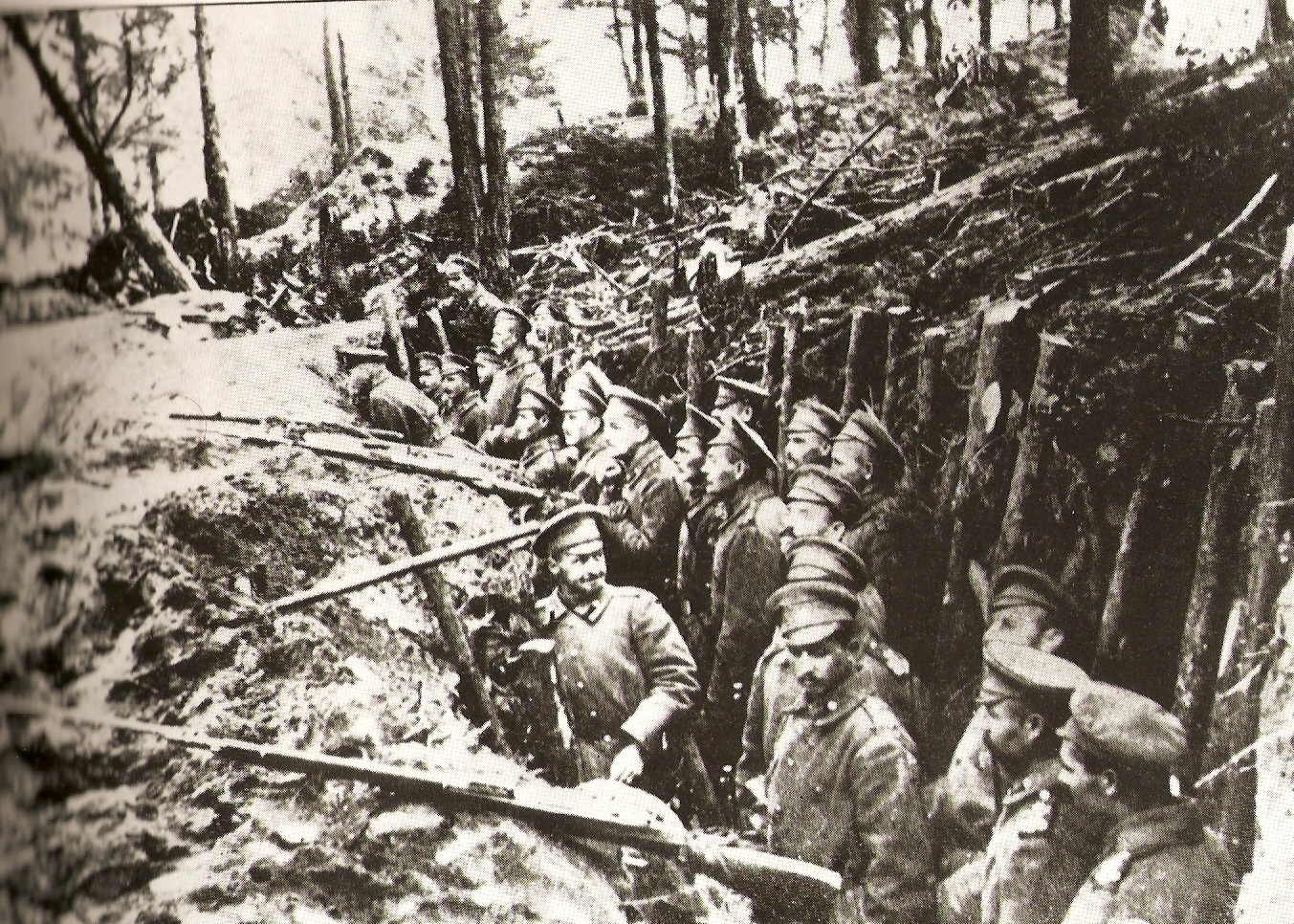
Russian trenches in the forests of Sarikamish in the Caucasus Mountains.

- As result of his military failures during the Serbian Campaign, Oskar Potiorek was relieved of command of the Austro-Hungarian Army in the Balkans and replaced with Archduke Eugen of Austria, while the weakened 4th and 5th Armies of Austria-Hungary merged to become the 5th Army of 95,000 men.
- Battle of Sarikamish — Ottoman Empire forces began an offensive against the Imperial Russian Army in the Caucasus between the borders of each empire.
- Battle of Givenchy — French troops relieved British Indian troops at Givenchy, France, officially ending the battle.
- Battle of Łowczówek — The First Brigade of the Polish Legions, allied with Austria-Hungary, fought Russian troops for key strategic hill defenses around the village of Łowczówek in Galicia (now south-western Poland).
- The thick ice opened up in the Weddell Sea, allowing the ship Endurance to continue steadily southward for the next two weeks towards the Antarctic, putting the Imperial Trans-Antarctic Expedition back on schedule.
- The XIII Brigade of the Royal Horse Artillery was dissolved in the Indore district of British India after members were absorbed into new Indian Brigades to serve on the Western Front.
- American playwright Edward Sheldon debuted his drama The Song of Songs at the 42nd Street Theatre in New York City where it became a box office success despite mixed reviews.
- Born:
  - Satchidananda Saraswati, Indian guru, known for modernizing ancient yoga texts Yoga Sutras of Patanjali and Bhagavad Gita; as C. K. Ramaswamy Gounder, in Chettipalayam, British India (present-day India) (d. 2002)
  - Colin Hannah, Australian air force officer and politician, Chief of the Royal Australian Air Force from 1970 to 1972, 19th Governor of Queensland; in Menzies, Western Australia, Australia (d. 1978)
  - Emil Sitka, American actor, best known for working with all six of The Three Stooges; in Johnstown, Pennsylvania, United States (d. 1998)

== December 23, 1914 (Wednesday) ==
- Battle of Sarikamish — Two divisions with the Ottoman Empire pursued retreating Russian forces Ardahan in what is now the border between Turkey and Georgia, but thick fog confused a trailing division to believe the one in front was Russian instead of Ottoman. The resulting friendly fire cost Ottoman forces the lives of 2,000 soldiers.
- Battle of Łowczówek — After initial Russian counterattacks forced the First Brigade of the Polish Legions to retreat from Łowczówek in Galicia, conflicting orders from the Austro-Hungarian command called for them to recapture lost positions.
- Battle of Rufiji Delta — The Royal Navy sent two shallow ships to engage the German cruiser SMS Königsberg hiding in Rufiji River in German East Africa but were driven away by defensive fire.
- The dissident Argentine association football organization Federación Argentina de Football merged with the Argentine Football Association following a three-year competing run against the established football competition.
- French deputy Georges Bonnefous put forth a legislative bill to create the Croix de la Valeur Militaire ("Cross of Military Valor") that was signed by 66 other deputies. The bill would eventually create the Croix de guerre (War Cross) award given to French soldiers or allies who displayed valor during World War I.
- The city of San Bruno, California was incorporated.
- Born: Fred Coe, American television producer, best known for the 1950s TV anthology series Goodyear Television Playhouse; as Frederick Hayden Hughs Coe, in Alligator, Mississippi, United States (d. 1979)

== December 24, 1914 (Thursday) ==
- Battle of Sarikamish — Ottoman troops were forced on a punishing march through deep snow and freezing temperatures in the Caucasus towards Sarikamish and Kars. Thousands of soldiers died from hypothermia during the march.
- An unofficial temporary Christmas truce began between British and German soldiers on the Western Front.
- A similar Christmas truce was held between British and German colonial forces during the Siege of Mora in German Cameroon.
- Ross Sea party — British polar ship Aurora departed from Hobart, Tasmania, Australia for the Antarctic.
- The 10th and 11th Indian Divisions of the British Indian Army were established.
- The Rikuu West railroad was extended in Yamagata Prefecture, Japan, with stations Sakata serving the line.
- The Fitch Publishing Company was established in New York City, where it became renowned for its credit rating system.
- The musical Betty debuted at the Prince's Theatre in Manchester. Created by Frederick Lonsdale and Gladys Unger, composed by Paul Rubens and Ernest Steffan, and lyrics by Rubens and Adrian Ross, the musical enjoyed successful runs in London and New York City the following two years.
- The musical To-Night's the Night, composed by Paul Rubens, with lyrics by Percy Greenbank and Rubens, and a book adapted by Fred Thompson, made its Broadway debut at the Shubert Theatre in New York City at a start of successful run of 460 performances.
- Born:
  - Robert E. Cushman Jr., American marine officer, 25th Commandant of the Marine Corps, recipient of the Legion of Merit, Bronze Star Medal and Navy Cross for action during World War II; in Saint Paul, Minnesota, United States (d. 1985)
  - Franco Lucchini, Italian air force officer, commander of the 10° Gruppo with the Regia Aeronautica during World War II, recipient of the Iron Cross; in Rome, Kingdom of Italy (present-day Italy) (killed in action, 1943)
- Died: John Muir, Scottish-American geologist and ecologist, founder of the Sierra Club (b. 1838)

== December 25, 1914 (Friday) ==
- Battle of Ardahan — Ottoman forces began a month-long siege on the Russian-held city of Ardahan on the border between the Russian and Ottoman Empires.
- Battle of Łowczówek — Russian assaults from Tuchów in heavy fog forced the First Brigade of the Polish Legions to abandon its defense positions around Łowczówek, Galicia but succeeded in discouraging any further advances by the Imperial Russian Army. The Polish Legion sustained over 450 casualties during the battle, but received accolades from Austria-Hungary for its efforts. The battle is mentioned on the Tomb of the Unknown Soldier.
- Battle of Sarikamish — Russian forces were ordered to evacuate Sarikamish, a city on the border of the Russian and Ottoman Empire.
- Raid on Cuxhaven — British aircraft launched from warships attacked the German port of Cuxhaven with submarine support, although little damage was caused.
- HMS Empress, HMS Engadine, and HMS Riviera launched a seaplane attack on the Zeppelin sheds at Nordholz Naval Airbase, the first time a navy tried to exert sea power on land by means of the air. However, fog prevented the aircraft from reaching their target, and only three of the nine aircraft found their way back to their mother ships.
- The Echigo Railroad was established to connect Niigata and Kashiwazaki, Japan, with stations Akatsuka and Terao serving it.

== December 26, 1914 (Saturday) ==
- The British Expeditionary Force was reorganized into the First Army under command of Lieutenant-General Sir Douglas Haig and the Second Army under command of Horace Smith-Dorrien.
- Battle of Sarikamish — Russia completely retreated from Sarikamish in an orderly fashion, leaving behind two cavalry units and 1,000 railway engineers to defend the retreating line.
- German diplomat Franz von Papen recruited plantation manager Werner Horn in New York City to sabotage Canadian railways.
- The first annual general meeting of the Manitoba Amateur Hockey Association was held in Winnipeg.
- Amalgamated Press began publishing a second series of the comic Funny Wonder, with the run lasting until 1942.
- Born:
  - Richard Widmark, American actor, known for roles including his debut in Kiss of Death; in Sunrise Township, Chisago County, Minnesota, United States (d. 2008)
  - Baba Amte, Indian social worker and activist, known for organizing and advocating rehabilitation and empowerment program for poor people suffering from leprosy in India; as Murlidhar Devidas Amte, in Hinganghat, Central Provinces and Berar, British India (present-day Maharashtra, India) (d. 2008)
  - Crawford Gordon Jr., Canadian industrialist, leader of wartime defense production in Canada during World War II; in Winnipeg, Canada (d. 1967)
  - John Smith, American air marines officer, commander of VMA-223 squadron during the Solomon Islands campaign in World War II, recipient of the Medal of Honor, Legion of Merit, Distinguished Flying Cross, and Distinguished Service Order; in Lexington, Oklahoma, United States (d. 1972)
- Died: Thomas Kelly-Kenny, 74, British army officer, leading commander during the Second Boer War, recipient of the Order of the Bath and Order of St Michael and St George (b. 1840)

== December 27, 1914 (Sunday) ==
- First Battle of Champagne — French forces grouped near Perthes, France to begin a fresh assault on German defenses.
- Royal Navy destroyer HMS Success was wrecked off Fife Ness, Scotland during a massive storm but with no loss of life.
- Austro-Hungarian casualties from the Serbian campaign reached 215,000, forcing the Austro-Hungarian Army to disband the 5th and 6th Armies and reorganize the troops into other army units.
- Died: Charles Martin Hall, 51, American chemist and inventor, best known for his role in developing the Hall–Héroult process to smelting aluminium (b. 1863)

== December 28, 1914 (Monday) ==
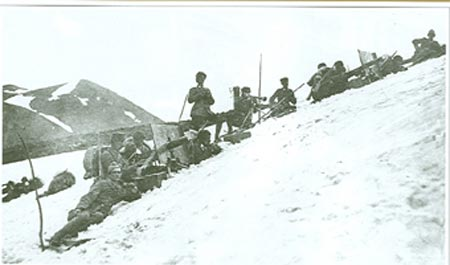
Ottoman machine gun unit at the Allahüekber Mountains during the Battle of Sarikamish.

- Battle of Sarikamish — The advance of Ottoman troops in the Caucasus slowed due to most of the soldiers being too exhausted and cold to continue marching, while Russian forces regrouped and held off the advance at the town of Horasan near the border between the two empires.
- South Australian Railways opened the Peebinga railway line from Karoonda to Peebinga, South Australia, Australia.
- The British film A Study in Scarlet was the first ever to feature the literary detective Sherlock Holmes. Francis Ford both played the title role and directed the film, with his brother, future Western film director John Ford, playing Watson.The film is missing from the BFI National Archive, and is listed as one of the British Film Institute's "75 Most Wanted" lost films.
- Mary Pickford starred as Cinderella in the film of the same name, directed by James Kirkwood Sr., produced by Daniel Frohman, and released by Famous Players Film Company. The film is still readily available through archives and online.
- The film serial The Exploits of Elaine was released, with Pearl White playing the damsel in distress. The serial was an inductee to the 1994 National Film Registry list, commenting that it "boasts increasingly sophisticated camera work and production values."
- The Military Cross decoration for commissioned British officers below the rank of captain was established.

== December 29, 1914 (Tuesday) ==
- Battle of Sarikamish — Ottoman forces totaling 12,000 men attacked Sarikamish but only 300 men succeeded in breaking into the city. Russian defenders drove off the Ottoman troops, inflicting 6,000 casualties.
- The Imperial German Army formed the II Royal Bavarian Reserve Corps which included the 8th Bavarian Reserve Division, and the 38th, 39th, 40th, and 41st Reserve Corps, with support from the 75th, 76th, 77th, 78th, 79th, 80th, 81st, 82nd, 83rd, 84th, 86th, 88th, and 89th Infantry Reserve Divisions.
- The Stockton Street Tunnel opened for service in San Francisco.
- The municipality of Florida City, Florida was incorporated.
- Born:
  - Zainul Abedin, Indian artist, co-founder of the Faculty of Fine Arts, University of Dhaka; in East Mymensingh, British India (present-day Kishoreganj District, Bangladesh) (d. 1976)
  - Billy Tipton, American jazz musician, was posthumously outed as a transgender male; in Oklahoma City, United States (d. 1989)
  - Albert Tucker, Australian artist, member of the Heide Circle; in Melbourne, Australia (d. 1999)

== December 30, 1914 (Wednesday) ==
- First Battle of Champagne — As the French launched a new assault, the German counterattacked their right flank and took out three lines of defense and inflicted major casualties.
- Born:
  - Bert Parks, American singer and actor, best known for hosting the Miss America Pageant telecast from 1955 to 1979; as Bertram Jacobson, in Atlanta, United States (d. 1992)
  - Aloísio de Oliveira, Brazilian musician, best known for his collaborations with performer Carmen Miranda; in Rio de Janeiro, Brazil (d. 1995)

== December 31, 1914 (Thursday) ==
- Battle of Sarikamish — Ottoman forces retreating from Sarikamish were bogged down in the woods outside the city. Reduced from 12,000 to 2,500 soldiers and a handful of guns, the remaining units fled and freed major routes into Sarikamish for Russians to resupply.
- First Battle of Champagne — French forces retook the ground lost the previous day but four major counter-attacks by the Germans put the line offensive into disorganization.
- Brothers Adolph and John D. Spreckels of the Spreckels Sugar Company in San Diego constructed and donated the world's largest outdoor pipe organ for the Panama–California Exposition.
- The last issue of the Norwegian daily newspaper Solungen was published in Åsnes Municipality, Norway after which the paper merged with Glommendalens Social-Demokrat.
- T. S. Eliot wrote to Conrad Aiken from Merton College, Oxford, saying: "I hate university towns and university people, who are the same everywhere, with pregnant wives, sprawling children, many books and hideous pictures on the walls ... Oxford is very pretty, but I don't like to be dead."
