= Rychwałd =

Rychwałd may refer to the following places:

- Polish name for Rychvald in the Czech Republic
- Rychwałd, Lesser Poland Voivodeship (south Poland)
- Rychwałd, Silesian Voivodeship (south Poland)
