= Szczepanowice, Tarnów County =

Szczepanowice
- Village
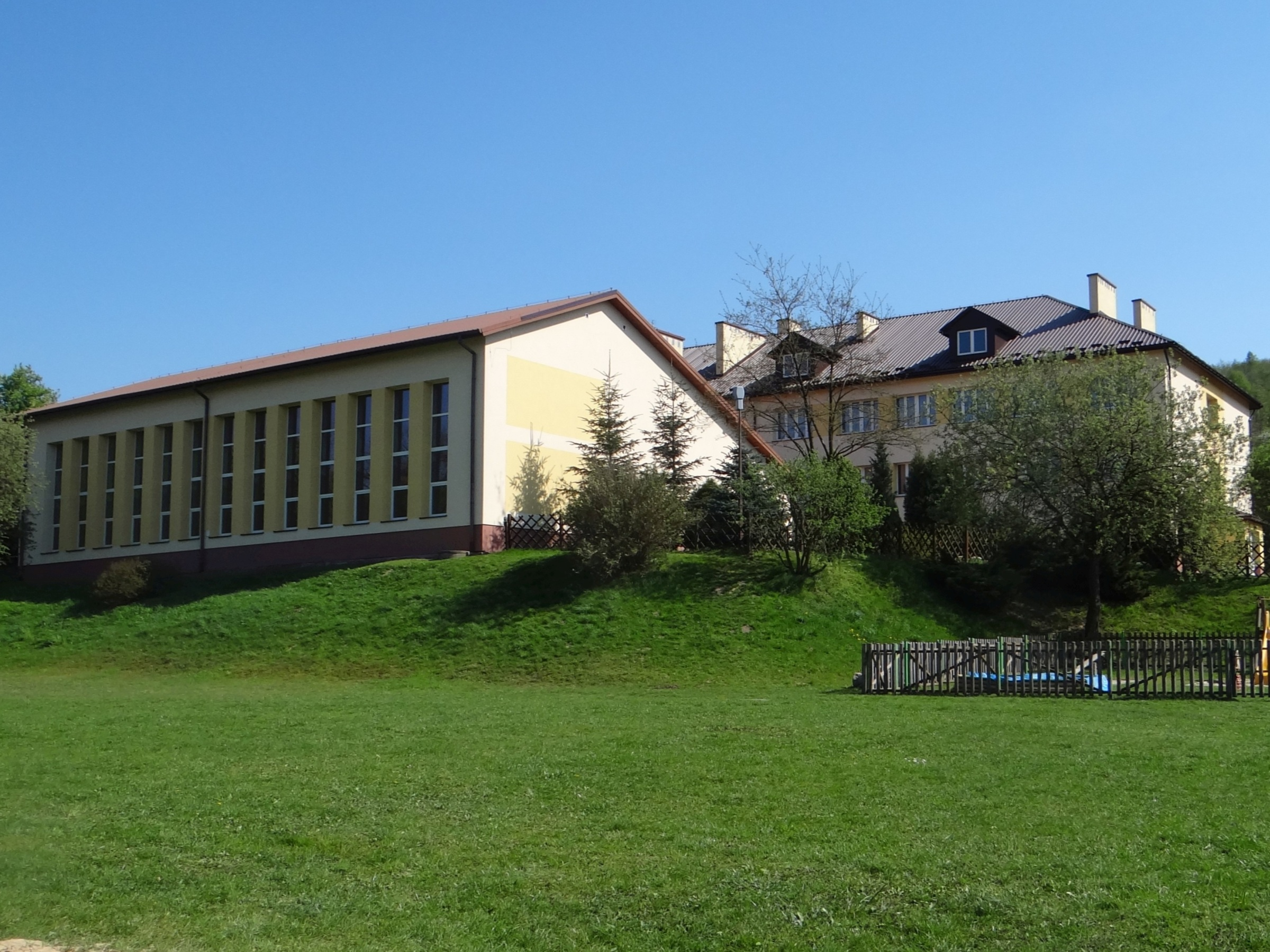
- School

- Location within Poland
- Coordinates: 49°57′N 20°54′E
- Country: Poland
- Voivodeship: Lesser Poland
- County: Tarnów
- Gmina: Pleśna
- Population (approx.): 1,550

Szczepanowice [ʂt͡ʂɛpanɔˈvit͡sɛ] is a village in the administrative district of Gmina Pleśna, within Tarnów County, Lesser Poland Voivodeship, in southern Poland.

The village has an approximate population of 1,550.
