= Janowice, Tarnów County =

Janowice
- Village
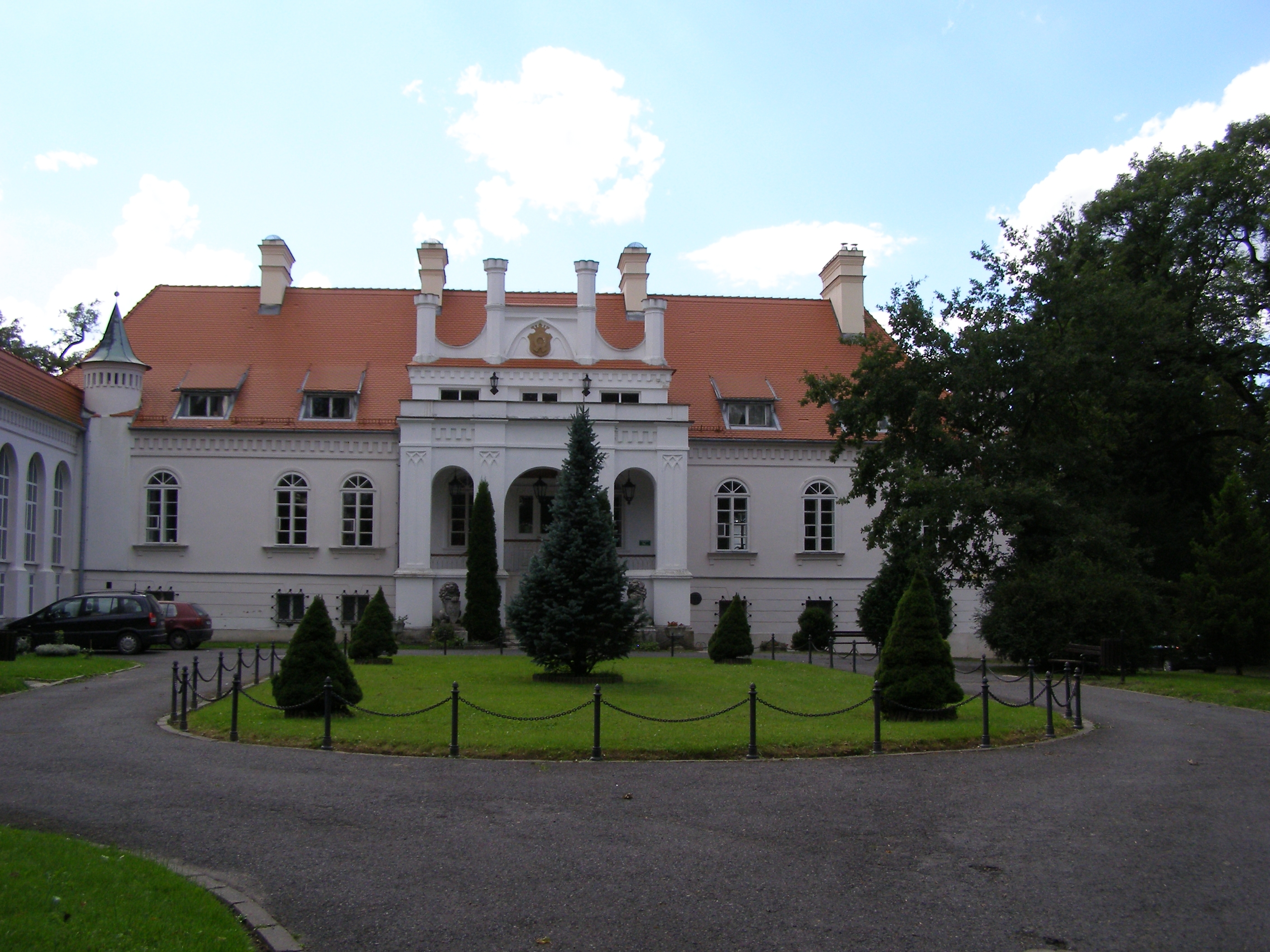
- Manor house

- Location within Poland
- Coordinates: 49°54′N 20°53′E
- Country: Poland
- Voivodeship: Lesser Poland
- County: Tarnów
- Gmina: Pleśna
- Website: http://www.janowice.net.pl

Janowice [janɔˈvit͡sɛ] is a village in the administrative district of Gmina Pleśna, within Tarnów County, Lesser Poland Voivodeship, in southern Poland.
