= Rzuchowa =

- Village
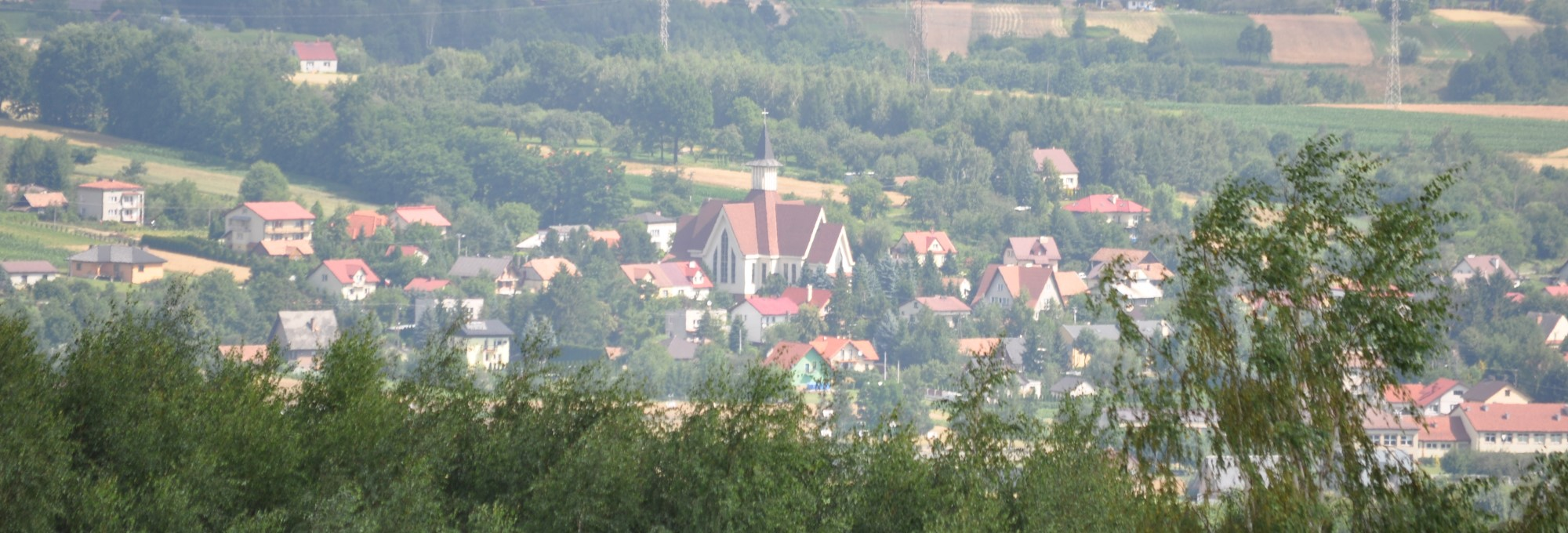

- Location within Poland
- Coordinates: 49°57′N 20°57′E
- Country: Poland
- Voivodeship: Lesser Poland
- County: Tarnów
- Gmina: Pleśna
- Population (approx.): 2,000

Rzuchowa [ʐuˈxɔva] is a village in the administrative district of Gmina Pleśna, within Tarnów County, Lesser Poland Voivodeship, in southern Poland.

The village has an approximate population of 2000.
