= Lichwin, Lesser Poland Voivodeship =

Lichwin
- Village
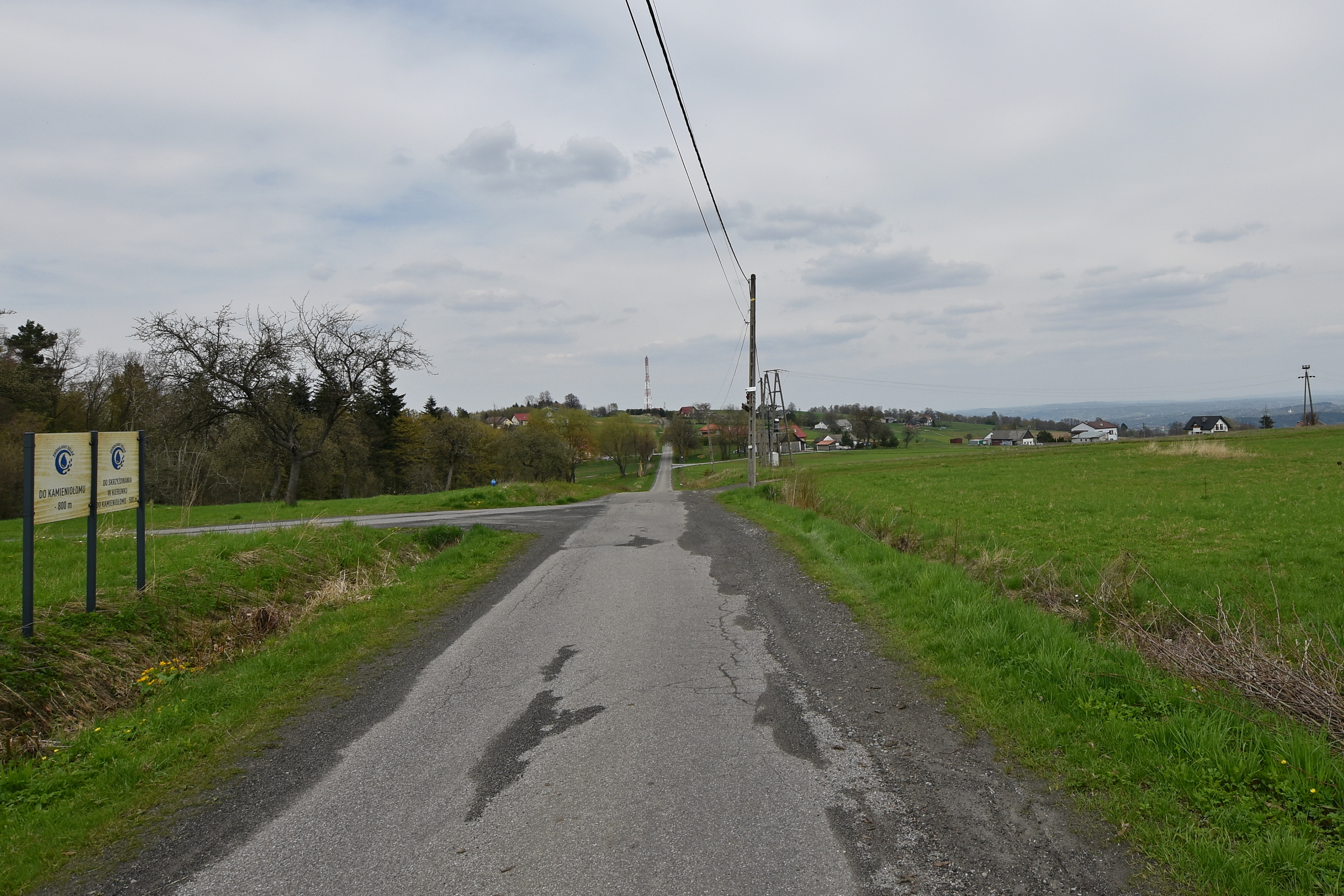

- Location within Poland
- Coordinates: 49°53′N 20°57′E
- Country: Poland
- Voivodeship: Lesser Poland
- County: Tarnów
- Gmina: Pleśna
- Elevation: 526 m (1,726 ft)
- Population (approx.): 1,200

Lichwin [ˈlixfin] is a village in the administrative district of Gmina Pleśna, within Tarnów County, Lesser Poland Voivodeship, in southern Poland.

The village has an approximate population of 1,200.
