= Świebodzin, Tarnów County =

Świebodzin
- Village
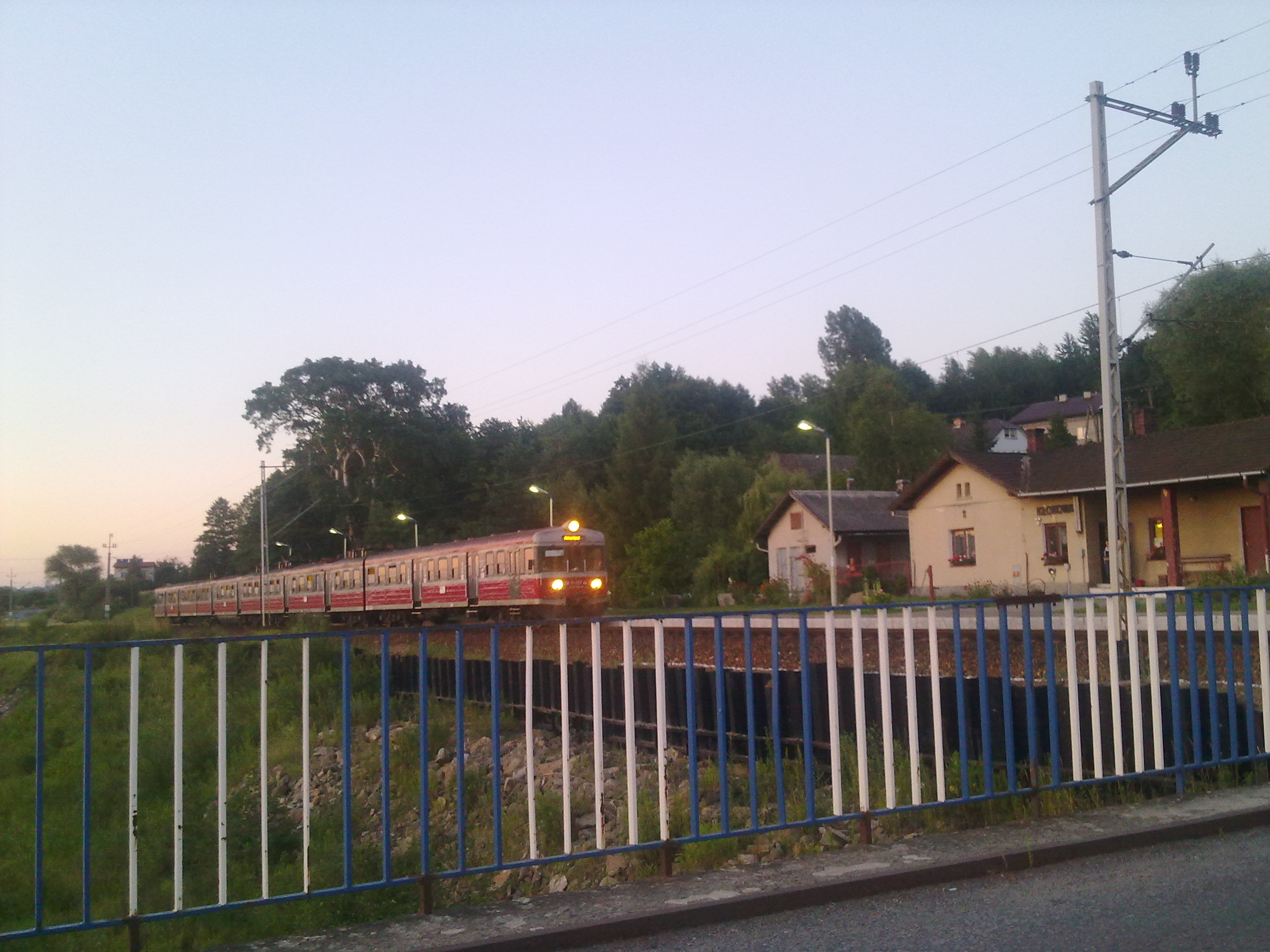

- Location within Poland
- Coordinates: 49°57′26″N 20°57′54″E
- Country: Poland
- Voivodeship: Lesser Poland
- County: Tarnów
- Gmina: Pleśna

Świebodzin (Polish pronunciation: [ɕfjɛˈbɔd͡ʑin]) is a village in the administrative district of Gmina Pleśna, within Tarnów County, Lesser Poland Voivodeship, in southern Poland.
