= Lubinka =

- Village
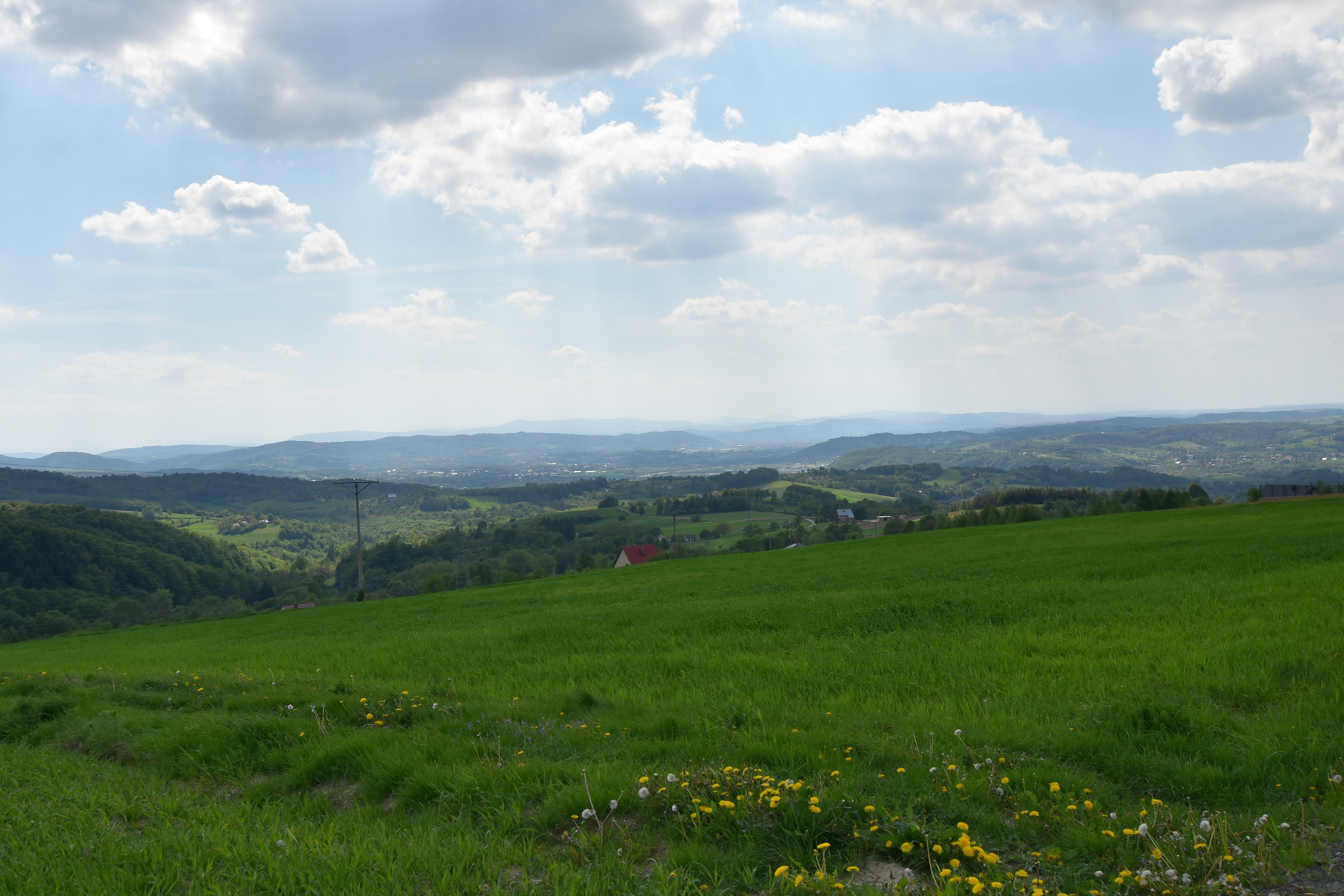

- Location within Poland
- Coordinates: 49°54′N 20°54′E
- Country: Poland
- Voivodeship: Lesser Poland
- County: Tarnów
- Gmina: Pleśna

Lubinka [luˈbiŋka] is a village in the administrative district of Gmina Pleśna, within Tarnów County, Lesser Poland Voivodeship, in southern Poland.
