= Woźniczna =

- Village
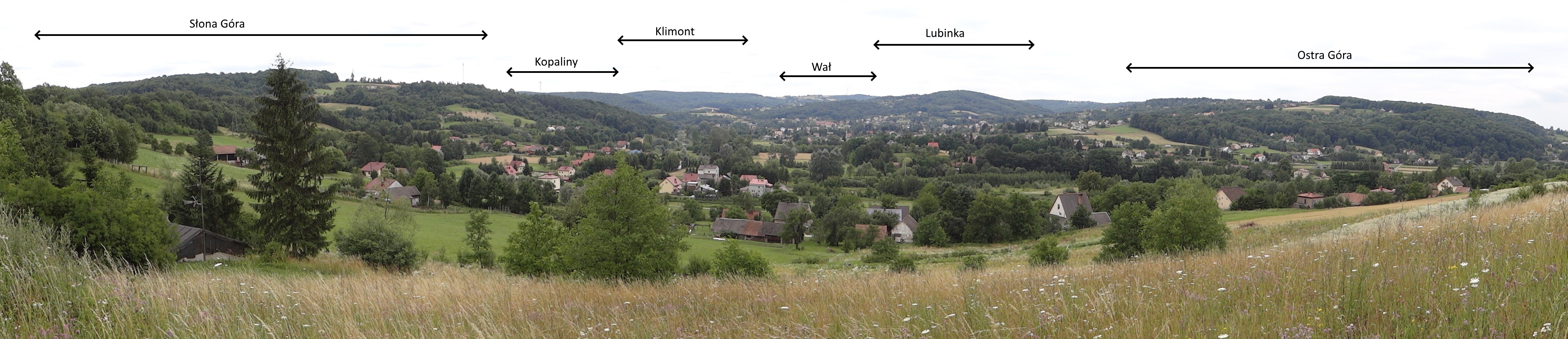

- Location within Poland
- Coordinates: 49°57′N 20°58′E
- Country: Poland
- Voivodeship: Lesser Poland
- County: Tarnów
- Gmina: Pleśna

Woźniczna [vɔʑˈnit͡ʂna] is a village in the administrative district of Gmina Pleśna, within Tarnów County, Lesser Poland Voivodeship, in southern Poland.
