= Battle of Łowczówek =

Battle of WWI (1914)

Coordinates: 49°55′00″N 20°59′00″E

- Part of the Eastern Front during World War I
Date	22–25 December 1914
Location	Łowczówek, Austria-Hungary (present-day Poland)
Result	Inconclusive

Belligerents
Austria-Hungary	Russian Empire

Commanders and leaders
(Austria-Hungary) Józef Piłsudski (Austria-Hungary) Edward Rydz-Śmigły (Austria-Hungary) M. Norwid-Neugebauer; Support: (Austria-Hungary) Svetozar Boroevic (Austria-Hungary) AD. Joseph Ferdinand	Radko Dimitriev

Units involved
(Austria-Hungary) 1st Brigade of Polish Legions: 1st Regiment; 5th Regiment; Support: (Austria-Hungary) 3rd Army (Austria-Hungary) 4th Army	3rd Army

Casualties and losses
470 casualties: 128 KIA (including 38 officers); 342 wounded	Unknown casualties: 600 prisoners of war

Battle of Łowczówek was a battle during World War I, fought on 22–25 December 1914 at Łowczówek, between the 1st Brigade of the Polish Legions, fighting for Austria-Hungary, and troops of Imperial Russia. The 1st Brigade was supported by some units of Hungarian infantry and Austrian artillery. The Austro-Hungarian-Polish forces held back the developing Russian offensive in the region, which allowed the bulk of the Austro-Hungarian army to avoid being surrounded and to withdraw, but had to yield their positions in the face of continued Russian attacks and the danger of being encircled itself.

== Background ==
In the first phase of the war, Russian Empire wanted to knock Austria-Hungary out of the conflict. To achieve this, the Russians invaded Galicia. By November 1914, they had captured Tarnów and Tuchów, and moved westwards, to Kraków. In December 1914, the Russians, who were divided into two armies (those of Generals Aleksei Brusilov and Radko Dimitriev), were stalled in the bloody Battle of Limanowa.

Following the battle, the Russians began to retreat to the positions along the Dunajec river, on the Carpathian Foothill. Soon afterwards, they counterattacked with 3rd Army of General Dimitriev, in the area of villages of Łowczów and Łowczówek. This area was located between the Austro-Hungarian 3rd and 4th Armies, and the Russians saw their chance in breaking the front of the enemy. To stop the Russians, Austro-Hungarian headquarters designated the 1st Brigade of the Polish Legions under Józef Piłsudski. At that time, the brigade was stationed in Nowy Sącz.

== Battle ==
Polish unit arrived at the battlefield in the evening of December 22, 1914, and immediately attacked enemy, in order not to allow the Russians to establish their positions on local hills. 1st Regiment, commanded Edward Rydz-Śmigły, was ordered to attack Hill 360, and 5th Regiment under Mieczysław Norwid-Neugebauer attacked Hill 343. 1st Regiment managed to capture the objective, but the attack of the 5th Regiment was halted due to strong Russian fire and darkness. In the morning of December 23, 5th Regiment, with support of Hungarian infantry and Austrian artillery, finally captured Hill 343.

Meanwhile, Russians reinforced their units and prepared a counterattack. In the night of December 23/24 they approached Polish positions and carried out several attacks. In the afternoon of December Józef Piłsudski was ordered to withdraw his brigade: the order was soon changed and Poles had to recapture the hills.

On December 25 the Russians attacked from Tuchów, along the road to Gromnik. Due to dense fog, both sides used bayonets, and Austrian units, defending their positions near Chojnik retreated, making it impossible to keep the line of the Biała river. Finally, at 1 p.m. on December 25, Poles were ordered to abandon their positions. Their retreat was very difficult, as Russians fiercely attacked their enemy from all sides. The 1st Brigade was sent to the rear, and rested in Lipnica Murowana.

== Aftermath ==
The Brigade captured their objectives, and managed to hold them for 4 days and 3 nights. It attacked the Russians 5 times, repelling 16 Russian counterattacks and capturing 600 prisoners of war. Due to bravery of Polish soldiers, Russian offensive was stopped, and the frontline remained static until the Gorlice–Tarnów Offensive (early May 1915).

Polish losses in the battle: 128 KIA (including 38 officers), 342 wounded. Headquarters of the 4th Army awarded 6 gold and 18 silver medals for bravery. All casualties of the battle were buried in Polish Legions Cemetery Nr. 171 in Łowczówek, near the road from Lowczow to Rychwałd.

The Battle of Łowczówek is mentioned on Tomb of the Unknown Soldier, Warsaw, with the inscription "LOWCZOWEK 24 XII 1914".
