= Gmina Pleśna =

Gmina Pleśna Pleśna Commune
- Gmina
- Flag Coat of arms
- Interactive map of Gmina Pleśna
- Coordinates (Pleśna): 49°56′N 20°57′E
- Country: Poland
- Voivodeship: Lesser Poland
- County: Tarnów County
- Seat: Pleśna

Area
  - Total: 83.65 km^{2} (32.30 sq mi)

Population (2006)
  - Total: 11,518
  - Density: 137.7/km^{2} (356.6/sq mi)
- Website: http://gmina-plesna.w.interia.pl/

Gmina Pleśna is a rural gmina (administrative district) in Tarnów County, Lesser Poland Voivodeship, in southern Poland. Its seat is the village of Pleśna, which lies approximately 12 kilometres (7 mi) south of Tarnów and 74 km (46 mi) east of the regional capital Kraków.

The gmina covers an area of 83.65 square kilometres (32.3 sq mi), and as of 2006 its total population is 11,518.

== Villages ==
Gmina Pleśna contains the villages and settlements of Dąbrówka Szczepanowska, Janowice, Lichwin, Łowczówek, Lubinka, Pleśna, Rychwałd, Rzuchowa, Świebodzin, Szczepanowice and Woźniczna.

== Neighbouring gminas ==
Gmina Pleśna is bordered by the gminas of Gromnik, Tarnów, Tuchów, Wojnicz and Zakliczyn.
