= Pleśna, Lesser Poland Voivodeship =

Pleśna
- Village
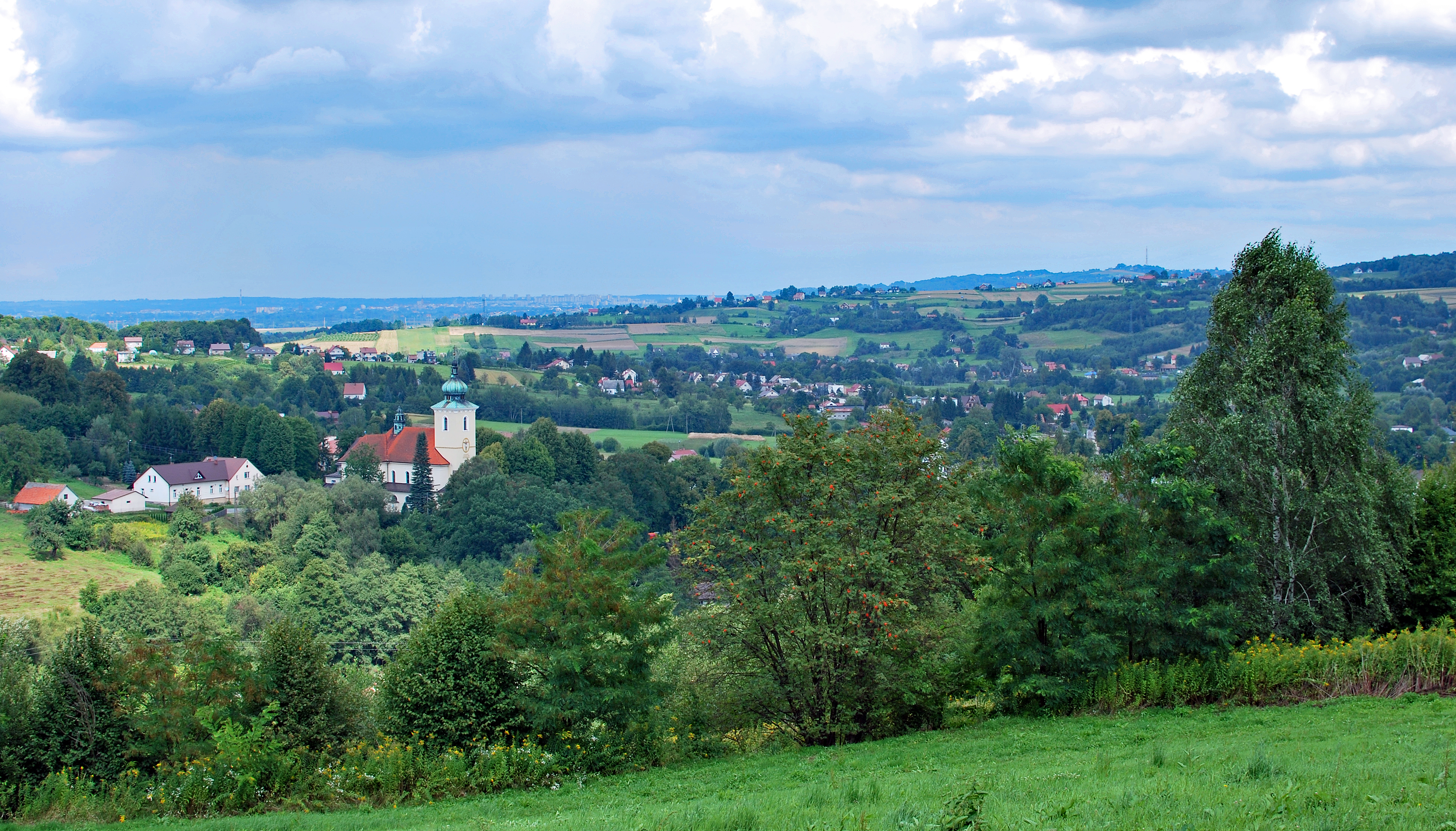
- Pleśna seen from the south

- Location within Poland
- Coordinates: 49°56′N 20°57′E
- Country: Poland
- Voivodeship: Lesser Poland
- County: Tarnów
- Gmina: Pleśna

Population
  - Total: 2,300
- Website: http://www.plesna.pl/

Pleśna [ˈplɛɕna] is a village in Tarnów County, Lesser Poland Voivodeship, in southern Poland. It is the seat of the gmina (administrative district) called Gmina Pleśna.
