= Arayamae Station =

Railway station in Tōno, Iwate Prefecture, Japan

Arayamae Station 荒谷前駅
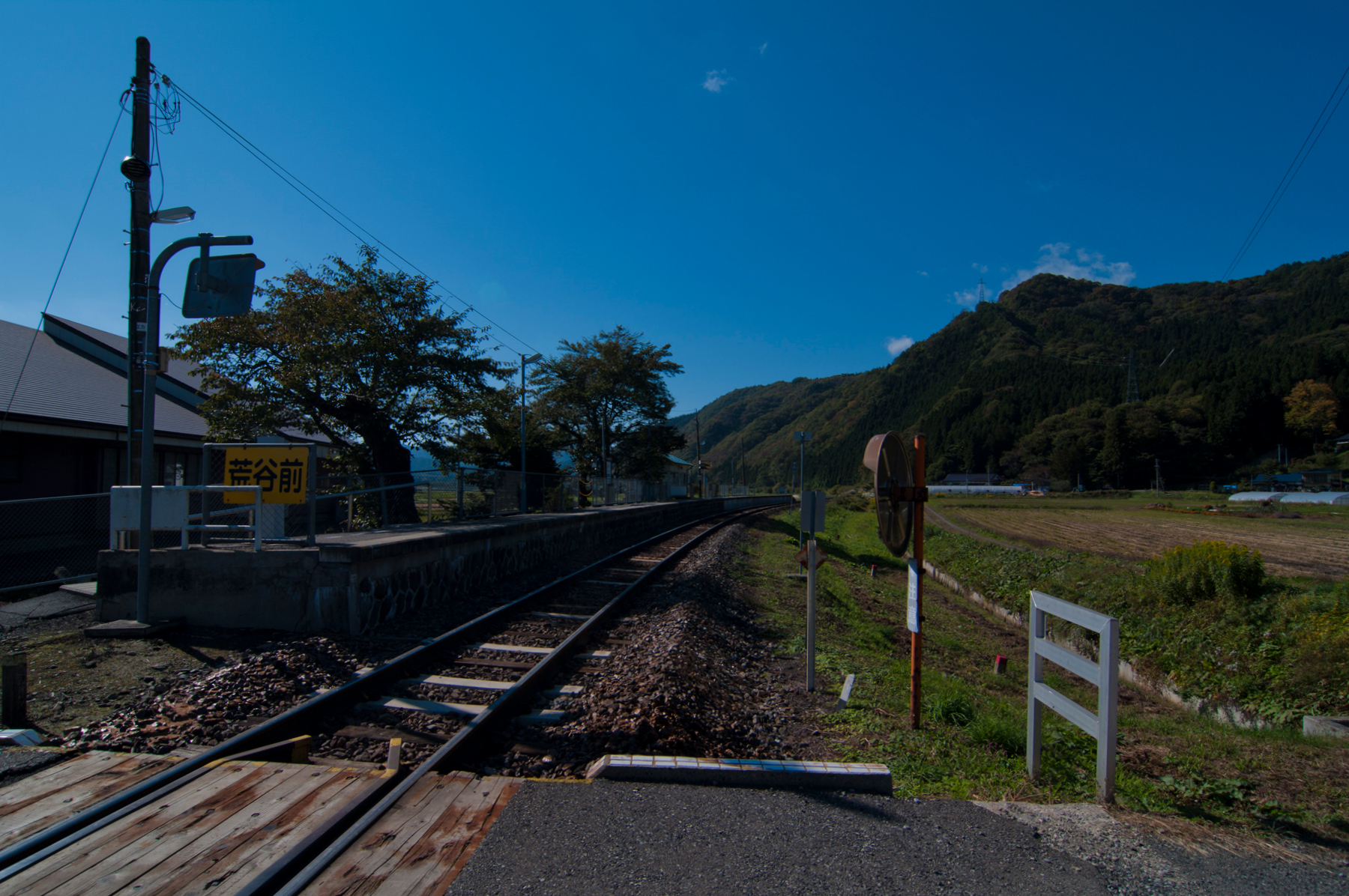
- Arayamae Station, October 2010

General information
- Location: Kamimasuzawa Miyamori-chō, Tōno-shi, Iwate-ken 028-0302; Japan
- Coordinates: 39.3097°N 141.4287°E
- Operator: JR East
- Line: ■ Kamaishi Line
- Distance: 36.4 km from Hanamaki
- Platforms: 1 side platform
- Tracks: 1

Construction
- Structure type: At grade

Other information
- Status: Unstaffed
- Website: Official website

History
- Opened: 16 December 1924

Services
Preceding station	JR East	Following station
Masuzawa towards Hanamaki	Kamaishi Line Local	Iwate-Futsukamachi towards Kamaishi
Location
- Location within Iwate Prefecture Location within Japan

Arayamae Station (荒谷前駅, Arayamae-eki) is a railway station in the city of Tōno, Iwate, Japan, operated by East Japan Railway Company (JR East).

== Lines ==
Arayamae Station is served by the Kamaishi Line, and is located 36.4 rail kilometers from the terminus of the line at Hanamaki Station.

== Station layout ==
The station has one side platform serving a single bi-directional track. The platform is curved. The station is unattended.

== History ==
Arayamae Station opened on 16 December 1924 as a station on the Iwate Light Railway (岩手軽便鉄道), a 762 mm (2 ft 6 in) light railway extending 65.4 km from Hanamaki to the now-defunct Sennintōge Station (仙人峠駅). The line was nationalized in 1936, becoming the Kamaishi Line. The station was absorbed into the JR East network upon the privatization of the Japanese National Railways (JNR) on 1 April 1987.

== Surrounding area ==
- National Route 283
- Sarugaishi River

== See also ==
- List of railway stations in Japan
