= Ayaori Station =

Railway station in Tōno, Iwate Prefecture, Japan

Ayaori Station 綾織駅
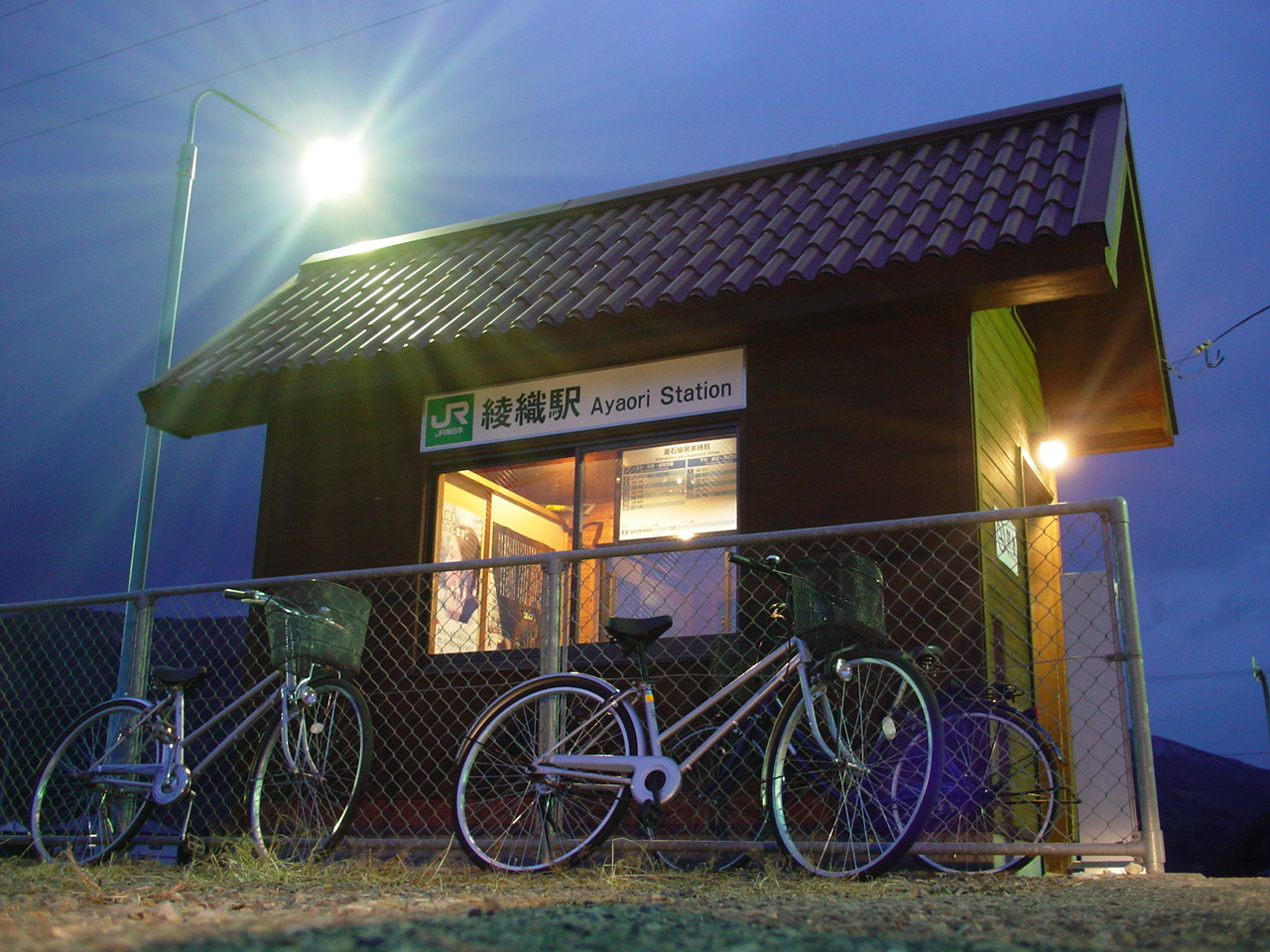
- Ayaori Station, February 2007

General information
- Location: 17 Niizato Ayaori-chō, Tōno-shi, Iwate-ken 028-0531; Japan
- Coordinates: 39.3283°N 141.4769°E
- Operator: JR East
- Line: ■ Kamaishi Line
- Distance: 41.1 km from Hanamaki
- Platforms: 1 side platform
- Tracks: 1

Construction
- Structure type: At grade

Other information
- Status: Unstaffed
- Website: Official website

History
- Opened: 15 December 1914

Services
Preceding station	JR East	Following station
Iwate-Futsukamachi towards Hanamaki	Kamaishi Line Local	Tōno towards Kamaishi
Location
- Location within Iwate Prefecture Location within Japan

Ayaori Station (綾織駅, Ayaori-eki) is a railway station in the city of Tōno, Iwate, Japan, operated by East Japan Railway Company (JR East).

== Lines ==
Ayaori Station is served by the Kamaishi Line, and is located 41.1 rail kilometers from the terminus of the line at Hanamaki Station.

== Station layout ==
The station has a single side platform serving a single bi-directional track. The station is unattended.

== History ==
Ayaori Station opened on 15 December 1914 as a station on the Iwate Light Railway (岩手軽便鉄道), a 762 mm (2 ft 6 in) light railway extending 65.4 km from Hanamaki to the now-defunct Sennintōge Station (仙人峠駅). The line was nationalized in 1936, becoming the Kamaishi Line. The station was absorbed into the JR East network upon the privatization of the Japanese National Railways (JNR) on 1 April 1987.

== Surrounding area ==
- Ayaori Post Office
- National Route 283
- National Route 396

== See also ==
- List of railway stations in Japan
