= Iwanebashi Station =

Railway station in Tōno, Iwate Prefecture, Japan

Iwanebashi Station 岩根橋駅
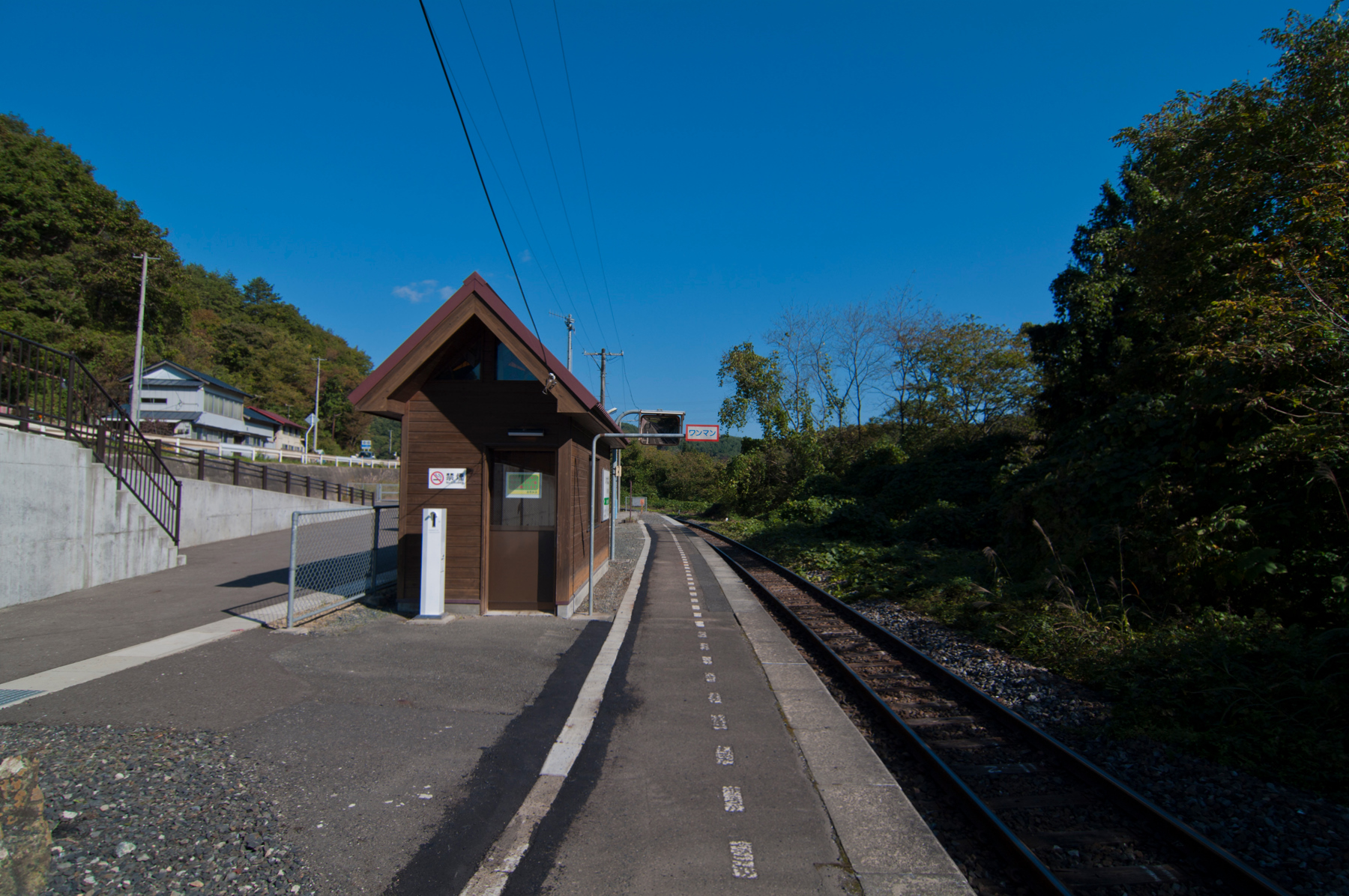
- Iwanebashi Station, October 2010

General information
- Location: 20 Jiwari Shimomiyamori Miyamori-chō, Tōno-shi, Iwate-ken 028-0304; Japan
- Coordinates: 39.3553°N 141.3188°E
- Operator: JR East
- Line: ■ Kamaishi Line
- Distance: 21.7 km from Hanamaki
- Platforms: 1 side platform
- Tracks: 1

Construction
- Structure type: At grade

Other information
- Status: Unstaffed
- Website: Official website

History
- Opened: 15 December 1914

Services
| Preceding station | JR East | Following station |
|---|---|---|
| Haruyama towards Hanamaki | Kamaishi Line Local | Miyamori towards Kamaishi |
Location
- Location within Iwate Prefecture Location within Japan

Iwanebashi Station (岩根橋駅, Iwanebashi-eki) is a railway station in the city of Tōno, Iwate, Japan, operated by East Japan Railway Company (JR East).

== Lines ==
Iwanebashi Station is served by the Kamaishi Line, and is located 21.7 rail kilometers from the terminus of the line at Hanamaki Station.

== Station layout ==
The station has one side platform serving a single bi-directional track. The station is unattended.

== History ==
Iwanebashi Station opened on 15 December 1914 as a station on the Iwate Light Railway (岩手軽便鉄道), a 762 mm (2 ft 6 in) light railway extending 65.4 km from Hanamaki to the now-defunct Sennintōge Station (仙人峠駅). The line was nationalized in 1936, becoming the Kamaishi Line. The station was absorbed into the JR East network upon the privatization of the Japanese National Railways (JNR) on 1 April 1987.

== Surrounding area ==
The station is located in an isolated rural area.

- National Route 283

== See also ==
- List of railway stations in Japan
