= 1914 Nicaraguan general election =

General elections were held in Nicaragua on 6 December 1914 to elect a president and Senate.

Adolfo Díaz won re-election as president defeating Carlos José Solórzano, both members of the Conservative party.
