= SS Belle of Spain =

History

United Kingdom;Norway
- Name: Belle of Spain (1908-1913); Nygaard (1913-1914)
- Owner: Crow, Rudolf & Co (1908-1913); Einar Engelsen (1913-1914)
- Operator: Belle of Spain Steamship Co Ltd (1908-1913); A/S Einar Engelsens Rederi (1913-1914)
- Builder: Northumberland Shipbuilding Co, Howdon
- Yard number: 149
- Launched: 5 December 1907
- Sponsored by: Mrs. P. W. Bertlin
- Commissioned: January 1908
- Homeport: Liverpool (1908-1913); Bergen (1913-1914)
- Identification: UK Official Number 124115; Call sign HMPG (1908-1913); Call sign MJHN (1913-1914)
- Fate: Wrecked, 26 November 1914

General characteristics
- Type: Cargo ship
- Tonnage: 4,223 GRT; 2,742 NRT; 7,300 DWT
- Length: 360 ft 2 in (109.78 m)
- Beam: 48 ft 0 in (14.63 m)
- Depth: 20 ft 2 in (6.15 m)
- Installed power: 372 Nhp
- Propulsion: Richardsons, Westgarth & Co 3-cylinder triple expansion
- Speed: 10.0 knots

Belle of Spain was a steam cargo ship built in 1908 by the Northumberland Shipbuilding Co of Newcastle for Crow, Rudolf & Co of Liverpool. The ship was designed and built for general cargo trade and spent her career doing tramp trade.

== Design and construction ==
In early 1900s Crow, Rudolf & Co ordered two ships, Belle of England and Belle of France, to carry cargo for their merchant operations. With their trade expanding, three more ships were ordered in subsequent years, with Belle of Spain being the last of the five Belle ships built for the company. The vessel was laid down at Northumberland Shipbuilding Co. shipyard in Howdon and launched on 5 December 1907 (yard number 149), with Mrs. P. W. Bertlin, of Jesmond, serving as a sponsor. After successful completion of sea trials, Belle of Spain was handed over to her owners in January 1908. The vessel was primarily intended for general cargo trade, and 8 steam winches, and large number of cargo derricks were installed to facilitate quick cargo loading and unloading process. In addition, accommodations for a large number of first and second-class passengers in houses on the bridge deck were built.

As built, the ship was 360 feet 2 inches (109.78 m) long (between perpendiculars) and 48 feet 0 inches (14.63 m) abeam, a mean draft of 20 feet 2 inches (6.15 m). Belle of Spain was assessed at 4,223 GRT and 2,742 NRT and had deadweight of approximately 7,300. The vessel had a steel hull, and a single 372 nhp triple-expansion steam engine, with cylinders of 25-inch (64 cm), 41-inch (100 cm) and 69-inch (180 cm) diameter with a 48-inch (120 cm) stroke, that drove a single screw propeller, and moved the ship at up to 10.0 knots (11.5 mph; 18.5 km/h).

To operate the vessel, a holding company, Belle of Spain Steamship Co Ltd, was registered on January 16, 1908 with capital of £15,000.

== Operational history ==
=== In British registry ===
After delivery Belle of Spain was immediately chartered for South American trade, and departed for her maiden voyage on February 9, 1908 from Hull via Dunkerque and St. Vincent. She arrived in Montevideo on March 9 and from there proceeded to Rosario, reaching it on March 15. The ship was loaded with agricultural products, such as wheat, maize and linseed in South America and left Montevideo on April 18. The vessel touched off at St. Vincent on May 7, Havre on May 20, before finally reaching Hull on May 25, 1908.

The ship conducted two more trips down to South America from England in 1908. For her second trip, she sailed from Barry on June 16, 1908, arriving in Montevideo on July 15 via Dunkirk and Tenerife. The vessel departed Rosario for her return journey on August 31, called at St. Vincent on September 18, and arrived in Belfast on September 30. Belle of Spain left for her third trip from Barry on October 14 to load cargo at Cardiff, Dunkirk, Havre and Pauillac. She left from Pauillac on October 30 and arrived at Montevideo on November 27 via Vigo and Tenerife. The ship again visited ports of Buenos Aires and Rosario but this time she also continued to Santos arriving there on December 19. The ship was loaded with 44,628 bags of coffee and departed Santos on January 2, 1909 for Havre, which she reached on January 29.

Upon return to England, the ship was chartered for one trip to Southeast Asia, and left Cardiff for Colombo on February 19. After passing through the Suez Canal on March 7, the vessel reached her destination on March 23. From Ceylon, the vessel continued on, visiting ports of Madras, Bassein and Rangoon. She sailed from Rangoon on her return trip for Hamburg on April 29 and arrived at Cuxhaven on June 16.

From Germany the ship sailed to Sweden via Newcastle where she loaded iron ore at Luleå and left for Philadelphia on July 10. The vessel made a stopover at South Shields on her way over to North America, departing it on July 19, 1909. During the journey in the Atlantic, the vessel experienced some rough weather and had to stay in Philadelphia for minor repairs. Subsequently, she was chartered by the Dominion Steel Company to transport steel rails from the company's plant in Nova Scotia to the site of Grand Trunk Pacific Railroad being constructed on the West coast of Canada. Belle of Spain continued on to North Sydney, where she took on around 6,000 tons of rails and left Sydney on September 1, 1909. During the trip, the vessel ran into more rough weather and had her steering gear damaged, and as a result she had to call in St. Lucia for repairs on September 10. It took over a month to finalize her repairs, and it was not until October 18 that the ship could leave St. Lucia. Belle of Spain proceeded then to Prince Rupert by rounding the Cape Horn, and called at Nanaimo on November 14 to replenish her bunkers. During her long journey, one of the officers on board went insane, and had to be institutionalized upon arrival at Prince Rupert.

Upon unloading, Belle of Spain was chartered to carry phosphate rock from Ocean Island to Europe, and departed Victoria on December 21, 1909. After loading her cargo the ship departed Ocean Island on January 29, 1910 and arrived at Stettin on April 13 via Colombo and Malta. Belle of Spain afterwards proceeded to England and left from Newport on May 6 for Bahía Blanca which she reached on June 5.

Next, the vessel was chartered to transport coal from Newcastle to the West coast of South America, and left Bahía Blanca on June 16. The ship called at Durban and arrived at her destination on August 2. After loading 5,619 tons of coal, Belle of Spain departed Newcastle on August 19 for Talcahuano and arrived there on September 16. The vessel was afterwards chartered by the W. R. Grace & Co and proceeded to Valparaíso, Antofagasta and Iquique to load 4,500 tons of nitrates for delivery to California. Belle of Spain arrived in San Francisco on November 30, 1910. After unloading most of her cargo, the vessel continued north calling at several Pacific ports. For example, the ship unloaded about 1,100 tons of her cargo at Victoria on December 20. Next, Belle of Spain proceeded to Puget Sound and loaded approximately 1,000,000 feet of redwood, over 50,000 railroad ties, wheat and flour for delivery to South American ports. The ship stopped at San Francisco to load about 50,000 more feet of lumber before sailing for Peruvian and Chilean ports on January 16, 1911. Belle of Spain continued nitrate-sugar-lumber trade for the remainder of her 10 month-long charter with W. R. Grace & Co. until November 1911 when she was chartered for one trip to bring nitrate of soda cargo to the US. The ship departed Iquique on December 19, 1911, stopped at Punta Arenas and Montevideo and arrived in Philadelphia on February 18, 1912.

From Philadelphia the ship sailed to Jacksonville and Savannah where she took on, among other things, 3,300 tons of phosphate pebble and 6,145 bales of cotton, respectively, for delivery to Bremen and Hamburg. Belle of Spain departed Savannah on March 28 and arrived at Cuxhaven on April 27. Upon unloading, the ship departed from Cardiff on May 18, 1912 for the West coast of South America and returned to Antwerp on November 5 with a cargo of nitrates.

On December 1, 1912 while proceeding on her way from Antwerp to La Plata, Belle of Spain ran aground off Flushing but was successfully refloated with the aid of five tugs and later proceeded to Flushing harbor for inspection which found no evidence of damage. 550 tons of cargo, mostly cement and rails, had to be discharged to refloat the boat. Afterwards, the vessel continued her journey ultimately returning to Europe in early April 1913.

On April 17, 1913 it was reported that Belle of Spain was sold to the Norwegian ship operator Einar Engelsen for £41,000 and renamed Nygaard.

=== In Norwegian registry ===
Nygaard left for her first trip under new name and ownership from Shields for Key West and other Florida ports on April 27, 1913. The ship arrived at Tampa on May 18, where she took on 3,301 tons of phosphate pebble, and then continued on to Pensacola, reaching it on May 20, to load timber and lumber. The vessel departed Pensacola on May 28 and arrived at Dunkerque on June 18 to unload her cargo.

On her next trip Nygaard departed Hamburg on July 14, 1913 for Pensacola via Shields, and arrived at her destination on August 11. She continued to Mobile and then Tampa where she took on 3,010 tons of phosphate pebble on August 28. Afterwards, the ship sailed to Galveston where she arrived on August 30. Here Nygaard loaded 9,239 bales (4,770,000 pounds) of cotton and sailed on September 14 for Havre and Dunkerque.

On October 15, 1913 Nygaard struck the dock entrance at Havre while undocking and had to be put back to repair the damage. The vessel was able to depart Havre on October 17 and took course to Jacksonville via Dunkerque and Cardiff and reached Florida on November 20 to load 3,200 tons of phosphate hard rock for delivery to Danzig. Next, the ship sailed to Savannah and took on board 7,236 bales of cotton and departed on November 26 for her return trip to Bremerhaven, reaching it on December 19.

In 1914 the vessel conducted two more trips to the ports of the American Southeast after being chartered by the Gans Steamship Line. During the first one, the ship left Hamburg on January 20, 1914 and returned to Rotterdam on April 12 after visiting the ports of Charleston, Savannah and New York City. For her second trip, Nygaard left Rotterdam on April 21 and after visiting ports of Tampa and Savannah returned to Hamburg on June 25.

Nygaard left Hamburg for her last trip on July 4 arriving in Charleston on July 26. Two days later Austria-Hungary declared war on Serbia starting World War I. As more European countries joined the war, it became clear the ship can no longer safely travel to the Northern European ports she used to frequent. The steamer sailed to Jacksonville to load potash and then to Philadelphia via Newport News to load coal and departed for Rio de Janeiro on August 22. From Brazil the ship returned in ballast to the Gulf ports of the US and arrived at Port Arthur on October 20 to load approximately 4,000 tons of cotton seed cake. The steamer then continued on to Galveston and reached it on October 25. After loading 3,300 bales of cotton 800 tons of rosin, Nygaard departed Galveston on October 28 for Denmark.

=== Sinking ===
After an uneventful journey from North America, Nygaard arrived around 18:30 on November 25 in view of Esbjerg harbor. The vessel was under command of captain Løvdal and had a crew of 30 men. After spotting the Grådyb Lightship the ship started steering towards the entrance to the harbor and after approximately 20 minutes sent a signal to inform about her arrival. This was immediately answered with a white light signal, which the captain incorrectly assumed to be coming from the pilot boat. Unbeknown to the captain, due to the war all land lighthouses were turned off and were only lit when ships were observed outside the entrance to the harbor channel. Around 19:00 the steamer's engines were set to "Ahead Slow" and the crew started depth measurements. After the plumb showed the depth of only 10 meters, the engines were immediately put to "Stop", but it was too late as the ship hit the ground shortly thereafter. The engines were reversed in an attempt to refloat the vessel, but Nygaard was stuck on the Grådyb sand bar and didn't move. Around 20:00 the pilots arrived and tried to dislodge the vessel, but all their attempts proved to be unsuccessful.

Next day a storm arrived, with strong winds and the heavy seas, and two vessels, Olga and Vildanden, came from Esbjerg to Nygaards assistance. However, the towing cables broke and Nygaard found herself dug even deeper in and leaking. On November 27, the crew abandoned ship and was safely transported to Esbjerg with the exception of the captain, who remained on-board the vessel. On November 28 Svitzer's tugs Viking and Ægir arrived on the scene, but the weather was still rough and the mission had to be postponed. Finally, on November 29 main post and a rudder broke off, and the No. 3 hold was full of water. As the weather did not improve in the next several days the ship was abandoned and on December 7 it was reported that Nygaard has been driven about a mile closer to the coastline and subsequently sank.
