= Łowczówek =

- Village
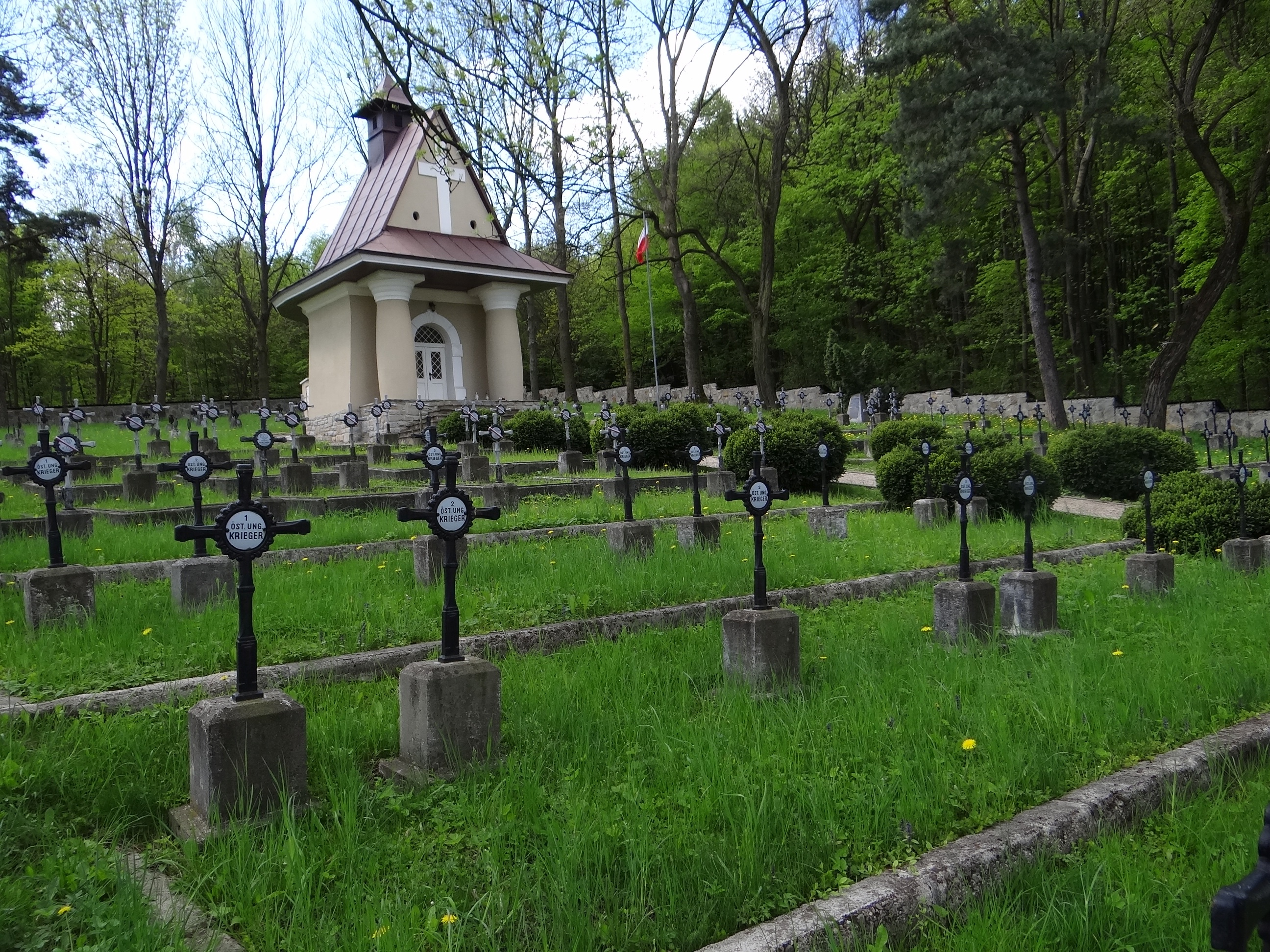
- World War I Cemetery nr 171

- Location within Poland
- Coordinates: 49°55′N 20°59′E
- Country: Poland
- Voivodeship: Lesser Poland
- County: Tarnów
- Gmina: Pleśna

Łowczówek [wɔfˈt͡ʂuvɛk] is a village in the administrative district of Gmina Pleśna, within Tarnów County, Lesser Poland Voivodeship, in southern Poland.

During World War I, it was a site of the battle between the Brigade I of the Polish Legions and Russian soldiers.
