= Iwate-Futsukamachi Station =

Railway station in Tōno, Iwate Prefecture, Japan

Iwate-Futsukamachi Station 岩手二日町駅
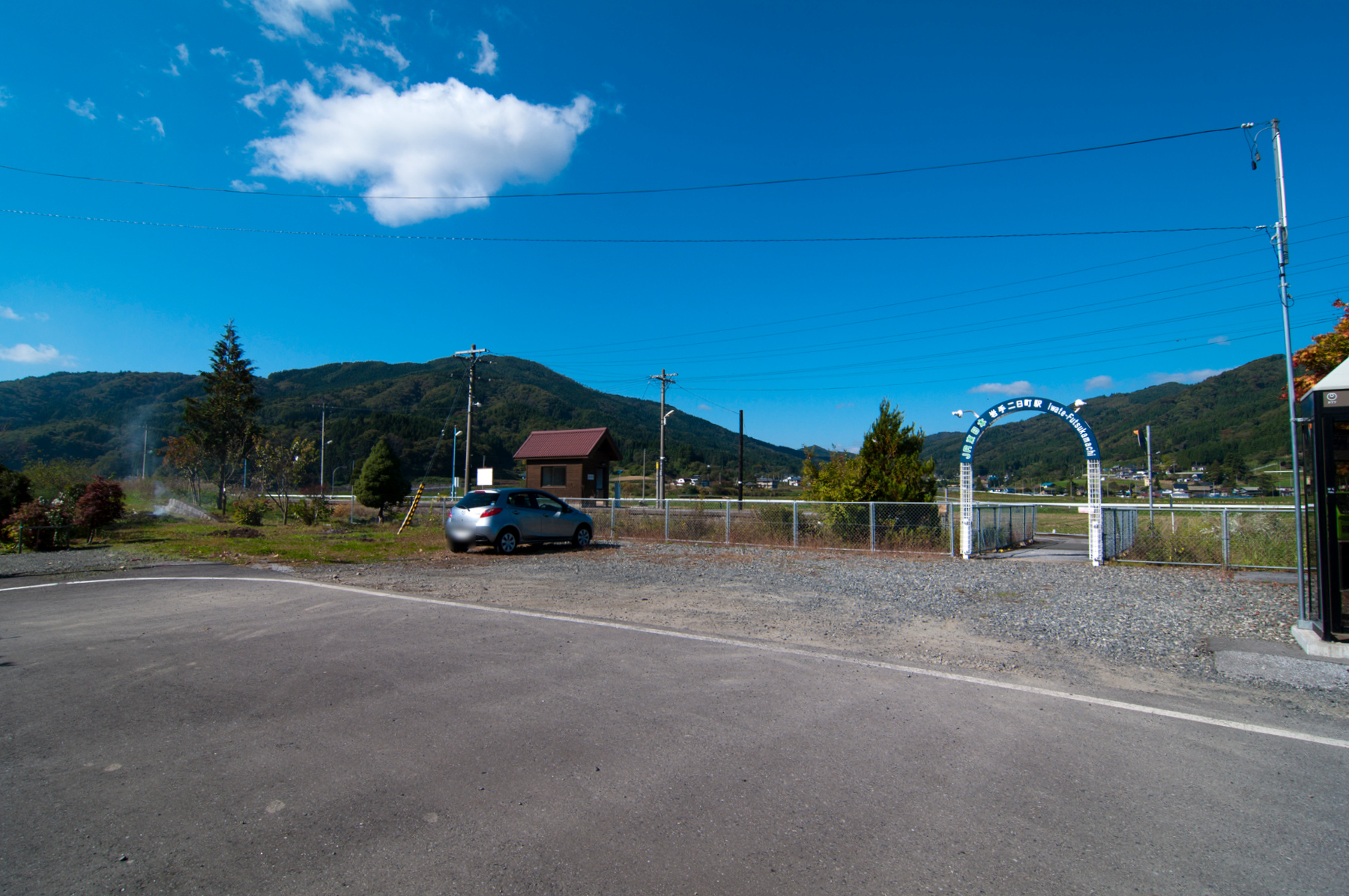
- Iwate-Futsukamachi Station in October 2010

General information
- Location: 75 Kamiayaori Ayaori-chō, Tōno-shi, Iwate-ken 028-0533; Japan
- Coordinates: 39.3235°N 141.4559°E
- Operator: JR East
- Line: ■ Kamaishi Line
- Distance: 39.3 km from Hanamaki
- Platforms: 1 side platform
- Tracks: 1

Construction
- Structure type: At grade

Other information
- Status: Unstaffed
- Website: Official website

History
- Opened: 15 December 1914
- Former names: Futsukamachi (to 1924)

Services
Preceding station	JR East	Following station
Arayamae towards Hanamaki	Kamaishi Line Local	Ayaori towards Kamaishi
Location
- Location within Iwate Prefecture Location within Japan

Iwate-Futsukamachi Station (岩手二日町駅, Iwate-Futsukamachi-eki) is a railway station in the city of Tōno, Iwate, Japan, operated by East Japan Railway Company (JR East).

== Lines ==
Iwate-Futsukamachi Station is served by the Kamaishi Line, and is located 39.3 kilometers from the terminus of the line at Hanamaki Station.

== Station layout ==
The station has one side platform serving a single bi-directional track. The station is unattended.

== History ==
The station opened on 15 December 1914 as Futsukamachi Stop (二日町停留場, Futsukamachi Teiryujo) on the Iwate Light Railway (岩手軽便鉄道), a 762 mm (2 ft 6 in) light railway extending 65.4 km from Hanamaki to the now-defunct Sennintōge Station (仙人峠駅). The station was elevated to a full passenger station and renamed Iwate-Futsukamachi on 15 December 1924.

The line was nationalized in August 1936, becoming the Kamaishi Line. The station was absorbed into the JR East network upon the privatization of the Japanese National Railways (JNR) on 1 April 1987.

== Surrounding area ==
- FutsukamachiPost Office
- National Route 283
- Sarugaishi River

== See also ==
- List of railway stations in Japan
