= List of Stolpersteine in Hamburg-Eppendorf =

Memorial installations in Germany

Stolperstein for Emil Bär at Kegelhofstraße 34. He was deported to Minsk in 1941 with his sister Rudolphine.

This list of Stolpersteine in Hamburg-Eppendorf contains the Stolpersteine laid in Eppendorf, a quarter in the Hamburg-Nord borough of Hamburg, Germany. It is part of the project by artist Gunter Demnig. The stones commemorate victims of the Nazis who lived in the quarter.

Each Stolperstein is a small concrete block with a brass plate on top. It is set into the sidewalk in front of the building where the victim last lived. The inscription gives the person's name, year of birth and fate. In Hamburg more than 90 percent of the stones bear the names of Jews.

== History ==
Peter Hess brought the Stolperstein project to Hamburg in 2002. Each stone needs a sponsor.

In 2006 the Landeszentrale für politische Bildung Hamburg (Hamburg State Center for Civic Education) and the Institut für die Geschichte der deutschen Juden (Institute for the History of the German Jews) began a citywide project to research the lives of the people named on the stones. In Eppendorf a working group formed at the local history archive in the autumn of 2006. Its results appeared in February 2011 as a two-volume book. The authors, Maria Koser and Sabine Brunotte, researched the biographies of about 260 people from Eppendorf and neighboring Hoheluft-Ost.

In June 2015 the stones for the siblings Emil and Rudolphine Bär at Kegelhofstraße 34 were found vandalized.

Each year on 9 November, the anniversary of Kristallnacht, descendants, residents and sponsors lay flowers and light candles at the stones in Eppendorf.

== List ==
The list is sorted by address. Each person is sourced to their entry on the Stolpersteine in Hamburg website.

Address	Person	Inscription	Image	Notes
Arnold-Heise-Straße 11; 53.586899°N 9.993159°E	Paul Braunschweig	Hier wohnte Paul Braunschweig Jg. 1884 gedemütigt/entrechtet Flucht in den Tod 30.4.1933		
Beim Andreasbrunnen 2; 53.5861796°N 9.9853054°E	Annie Höxter (née Bos)	Hier wohnte Annie Höxter geb. Bos Jg. 1892 deportiert 1941 Minsk ermordet		
Beim Andreasbrunnen 2; 53.5861834°N 9.9853082°E	Berthold Höxter	Hier wohnte Berthold Höxter Jg. 1877 deportiert 1941 Minsk ermordet		
Beim Andreasbrunnen 2; 53.5861787°N 9.9852907°E	Jacoba Meyer (née Bos)	Hier wohnte Jacoba Meyer geb. Bos Jg. 1888 Flucht 1939 Holland deportiert 1943 Theresienstadt 1944 Auschwitz ermordet		
Beim Andreasbrunnen 2; 53.5861822°N 9.9852933°E	Ludwig Meyer	Hier wohnte Ludwig Meyer Jg. 1885 Flucht 1939 Holland deportiert 1943 Theresienstadt 1944 Auschwitz ermordet		
Beim Andreasbrunnen 3; 53.5862677°N 9.9852419°E	Aron Anton Münden	Hier wohnte Aron Anton Münden Jg. 1867 deportiert 1942 Theresienstadt 1942 Treblinka ermordet		
Beim Andreasbrunnen 3; 53.5862707°N 9.9852455°E	Hedwig Münden (née Salomon)	Hier wohnte Hedwig Münden geb. Salomon Jg. 1879 deportiert 1942 Theresienstadt 1942 Treblinka ermordet		
Beim Andreasbrunnen 3; 53.5862707°N 9.9852455°E	Eva Nachum (née Berkowitz)	Hier wohnte Eva Nachum geb. Berkowitz Jg. 1878 deportiert 1941 Łodz/Litzmannstadt ermordet		
Beim Andreasbrunnen 3; 53.5862707°N 9.9852455°E	Leo Nachum	Hier wohnte Leo Nachum Jg. 1875 deportiert 1941 Łodz/Litzmannstadt ermordet 25.4.1942		
Beim Andreasbrunnen 4; 53.5863086°N 9.9854517°E	James Cohn	Hier wohnte James Cohn Jg. 1876 deportiert 1941 Łodz ermordet 3.1.1942		
Beim Andreasbrunnen 4; 53.5863086°N 9.9854517°E	Erich Gaertner	Hier wohnte Erich Gaertner Jg. 1890 deportiert 1941 Minsk ermordet		
Beim Andreasbrunnen 7; 53.5865718°N 9.9855135°E	Erwin Kraus	Erwin Kraus Jg. 1894 deportiert 1941 Minsk ermordet		
Beim Andreasbrunnen 7; 53.5865661°N 9.9855129°E	Hilde Kraus (née Bachner)	Hier wohnte Hilde Kraus geb. Bachner Jg. 1909 deportiert 1941 Minsk ermordet		
Beim Andreasbrunnen 8; 53.5865942°N 9.9857916°E	Emil Behrens	Hier wohnte Emil Behrens Jg. 1859 deportiert 1942 Theresienstadt ermordet 29.7.1942		
Beim Andreasbrunnen 8; 53.5865942°N 9.9857916°E	Jenny Behrens (née Levy)	Hier wohnte Jenny Behrens geb. Levy Jg. 1868 deportiert 1942 Theresienstadt ermordet 8.8.1942		
Beim Andreasbrunnen 8; 53.5865942°N 9.9857916°E	Lucie Moses (née Curjel)	Hier wohnte Lucie Moses geb. Curjel Jg. 1894 deportiert 1941 ermordet 29.10.1943 in Łodz		Another Stolperstein for this person is in Neustadt.
Beim Andreasbrunnen 8; 53.5865931°N 9.9857964°E	Leonhard Stein	Hier wohnte Dr. Leonhard Stein Jg. 1894 deportiert 1941 Łodz ermordet 29.8.1942		
Beim Andreasbrunnen 8; 53.5865904°N 9.9857937°E	Rosa Stein (née Frank)	Hier wohnte Rosa Stein geb. Frank Jg. 1872 deportiert 1941 Łodz ermordet 7.6.1942		
Beim Andreasbrunnen 9; 53.586653°N 9.985631°E	Gertrud Becher (née Thilo)	Hier wohnte Gertrud Becher geb. Thilo Jg. 1884 deportiert 1941 Riga ermordet		See also Haynstraße 15.
Beim Andreasbrunnen 9; 53.586653°N 9.985631°E	Heinz Becher	Hier wohnte Heinz Becher Jg. 1919 deportiert 1943 ???		
Beim Andreasbrunnen 9; 53.586653°N 9.985631°E	Emmy Frank (née Stern)	Hier wohnte Emmy Frank geb. Stern Jg. 1888 deportiert 1941 Łodz ermordet 5.4.1944		
Beim Andreasbrunnen 9; 53.586653°N 9.985631°E	Heinz Frank	Hier wohnte Heinz Frank Jg. 1920 deportiert 1941 Łodz/Litzmannstadt ermordet 22.1.1942		
Beim Andreasbrunnen 9; 53.586653°N 9.985631°E	Wilhelm Frank	Hier wohnte Wilhelm Frank Jg. 1882 deportiert 1941 Łodz ermordet 11.4.1942		
Beim Andreasbrunnen 9; 53.586653°N 9.985631°E	Erika Hesse	Hier wohnte Erika Hesse Jg. 1919 eingewiesen 1930 Alsterdorfer Anstalten ‚verlegt‘ 16.8.1943 Heilanstalt Am Steinhof/Wien ermordet 7.1.1944		
Curschmannstraße 6; 53.5855127°N 9.9805711°E	Norbert Prenzlau	Hier wohnte Norbert Prenzlau Jg. 1865 deportiert 1942 Theresienstadt tot 1.9.1942		
Curschmannstraße 6; 53.5855107°N 9.9805766°E	Olga Prenzlau (née Meyer)	Hier wohnte Olga Prenzlau geb. Meyer Jg. 1869 deportiert 1942 Theresienstadt tot 9.8.1942		
Curschmannstraße 8; 53.5855977°N 9.9803392°E	Johanna Allen (née Simon)	Hier wohnte Johanna Allen geb. Simon Jg. 1899 deportiert 1941 Lodz/Litzmannstadt Chelmno/Kulmhof ermordet Mai 1942		
Curschmannstraße 8; 53.5855977°N 9.9803392°E	Helene Elsa Bauer	Hier wohnte Helene Elsa Bauer Jg. 1875 gedemütigt/entrechtet Flucht in den Tod 7.3.1942		
Curschmannstraße 8; 53.5855977°N 9.9803392°E	Ilse Lippstadt	Hier wohnte Ilse Lippstadt Jg. 1905 deportiert 1941 Minsk ???		
Curschmannstraße 8; 53.5855977°N 9.9803392°E	Sara Gertrud Theiner (née Bauer)	Hier wohnte Sara Gertrud Theiner geb. Bauer Jg. 1872 gedemütigt/entrechtet Flucht in den Tod 6.3.1942		
Curschmannstraße 8; 53.5855977°N 9.9803392°E	Iwan von der Walde	Hier wohnte Iwan von der Walde Jg. 1883 1938 KZ Fuhlsbüttel Selbstmord 18.8.1942		
Eppendorfer Baum 30; 53.5841981°N 9.9831745°E	Charlotte Danziger	Hier wohnte Charlotte Danziger Jg. 1877 1941 KZ Fuhlsbüttel deportiert 1941 Łodz ermordet am 25.1.1942		On the sidewalk at the corner of Hegestraße, next to the pedestrian crossing Another Stolperstein for this person is in Harburg.
Eppendorfer Baum 34; 53.584431°N 9.982556°E	Alfred Blumenthal	Hier wohnte Alfred Blumenthal Jg. 1872 deportiert 1943 Theresienstadt ermordet 2.7.1943		
Eppendorfer Baum 34; 53.584431°N 9.982556°E	Katharina Blumenthal (née Abrahamsohn)	Hier wohnte Katharina Blumenthal geb. Abrahamsohn Jg. 1885 deportiert 1942 Theresienstadt 1943 Auschwitz ermordet		
Eppendorfer Baum 34; 53.584431°N 9.982556°E	Margreth Graetz	Hier wohnte Margreth Graetz Jg. 1901 gedemütigt/entrechtet Flucht in den Tod 4.12.1941		
Eppendorfer Baum 34; 53.584431°N 9.982556°E	Gustav Kron	Hier wohnte Gustav Kron Jg. 1878 deportiert 1941 Łodz ermordet		
Eppendorfer Baum 34; 53.584431°N 9.982556°E	Selma Kron (née Blumenkrohn)	Hier wohnte Selma Kron geb. Blumenkrohn Jg. 1890 deportiert 1941 Łodz ermordet		
Eppendorfer Baum 34; 53.584431°N 9.982556°E	Jacob Minska	Hier wohnte Jacob Minska Jg. 1907 ‚Schutzhaft‘ 1939 KZ Sachsenhausen deportiert 1941 Łodz/Litzmannstadt 1944 Auschwitz KZ-Außenlager-Görlitz befreit		
Eppendorfer Baum 44; 53.584819°N 9.982012°E	Adolph Meyer	Hier wohnte Adolph Meyer Jg. 1864 Flucht 1939 Holland interniert Westerbork deportiert 1942 Auschwitz ermordet 15.10.1942		
Eppendorfer Landstraße 6; 53.5853025°N 9.9822477°E	Herbert Kurt Friede	Hier wohnte Herbert Kurt Friede Jg. 1902 ermordet 5.12.1938 KZ Fuhlsbüttel		
Eppendorfer Landstraße 12; 53.585715°N 9.982989°E	Georg Horwitz	Hier wohnte Georg Horwitz Jg. 1885 deportiert 1941 ermordet in Minsk		
Eppendorfer Landstraße 12; 53.585715°N 9.982989°E	Selma Horwitz (née Heilner)	Hier wohnte Selma Horwitz geb. Heilner Jg. 1885 deportiert 1941 ermordet in Minsk		
Eppendorfer Landstraße 12; 53.585715°N 9.982989°E	Fanny Littmann (née Tschesljak)	Hier wohnte Fanny Littmann geb. Tschesljak Jg. 1875 deportiert 1943 Theresienstadt ermordet in Auschwitz		Listed on stolpersteine-hamburg.de under Altonaer Straße 8.
Eppendorfer Landstraße 12; 53.585715°N 9.982989°E	Joseph Littmann	Hier wohnte Joseph Littmann Jg. 1869 deportiert 1943 Theresienstadt 1943 Auschwitz ermordet		Listed on stolpersteine-hamburg.de under Altonaer Straße 8.
Eppendorfer Landstraße 12; 53.585715°N 9.982989°E	Annie Meyer (née Cohen)	Hier wohnte Annie Meyer geb. Cohen Jg. 1894 Flucht 1939 Belgien interniert Mechelen deportiert 1942 ermordet in Auschwitz		
Eppendorfer Landstraße 12; 53.585715°N 9.982989°E	Eva Jutta Meyer	Hier wohnte Eva Jutta Meyer Jg. 1925 Flucht 1939 Belgien interniert Mechelen deportiert 1942 ermordet in Auschwitz		
Eppendorfer Landstraße 14; 53.585878°N 9.983089°E	Charlotte Borchardt (née Breslauer)	Hier wohnte Charlotte Borchardt geb. Breslauer Jg. 1884 deportiert 1942 Theresienstadt befreit		
Eppendorfer Landstraße 14; 53.585878°N 9.983089°E	Claus-Jürgen Borchardt	Hier wohnte Claus-Jürgen Borchardt Jg. 1926 deportiert 1942 Theresienstadt 1944 Auschwitz ermordet 3.1.1945 Dachau		
Eppendorfer Landstraße 14; 53.585878°N 9.983089°E	Robert Salomon Borchardt	Hier wohnte Robert Salomon Borchardt Jg. 1869 deportiert 1942 Theresienstadt ermordet 2.10.1943		
Eppendorfer Landstraße 14; 53.585878°N 9.983089°E	Amalie Leser (née Janower)	Hier wohnte Amalie Leser geb. Janower Jg. 1896 deportiert 1941 Riga 1944 KZ Stutthof ???		Another Stolperstein for this person is in St. Georg.
Eppendorfer Landstraße 14; 53.585878°N 9.983089°E	Hans Leser	Hier wohnte Hans Leser Jg. 1924 deportiert 1941 Riga ???		Another Stolperstein for this person is in St. Georg.
Eppendorfer Landstraße 14; 53.585878°N 9.983089°E	Siegbert Leser	Hier wohnte Siegbert Leser Jg. 1888 deportiert 1941 Riga ???		Another Stolperstein for this person is in St. Georg.
Eppendorfer Landstraße 14; 53.585878°N 9.983089°E	Ernst J. Schönhof	Hier wohnte Ernst J. Schönhof Jg. 1864 deportiert 1942 Theresienstadt ermordet 2.11.1942		
Eppendorfer Landstraße 14; 53.585878°N 9.983089°E	Carl Stamm	Hier wohnte Dr. Carl Stamm Jg. 1867 gedemütigt/entrechtet Flucht in den Tod 28.10.1941		Another Stolperstein for this person is in Rothenburgsort.
Eppendorfer Landstraße 14; 53.585878°N 9.983089°E	Else Stamm (née Goslar)	Else Stamm geb. Goslar Jg. 1906 Flucht Holland deportiert 1942 Auschwitz ermordet 17.7.1942		
Eppendorfer Landstraße 14; 53.585878°N 9.983089°E	Eric Walter Stamm	Eric Walter Stamm Jg. 1935 geb. in Amsterdam deportiert 1942 Auschwitz ermordet		
Eppendorfer Landstraße 14; 53.585878°N 9.983089°E	Minna Margarethe Stamm (née Meyer)	Hier wohnte Minna Margarethe Stamm geb. Meyer Jg. 1878 gedemütigt/entrechtet tot 26.5.1941		
Eppendorfer Landstraße 14; 53.585878°N 9.983089°E	Rudolf W. Stamm	Hier wohnte Rudolf W. Stamm Jg. 1903 Flucht 1935 Holland deportiert 1942 Auschwitz ermordet 15.8.1942		
Eppendorfer Landstraße 18; 53.586156°N 9.983381°E	Erna Fischer (née Riess)	Hier wohnte Erna Fischer geb. Riess Jg. 1884 deportiert 1942 Theresienstadt ermordet 17.11.1942		
Eppendorfer Landstraße 18; 53.586156°N 9.983381°E	Hermann Fischer	Hier wohnte Hermann Fischer Jg. 1867 deportiert 1942 Theresienstadt ermordet 23.2.1943		
Eppendorfer Landstraße 18; 53.586156°N 9.983381°E	Adolph Hammerschlag	Hier wohnte Adolph Hammerschlag Jg. 1877 deportiert 1942 Auschwitz ermordet		
Eppendorfer Landstraße 18; 53.586156°N 9.983381°E	Meta Hammerschlag (née Goldmann)	Hier wohnte Meta Hammerschlag geb. Goldmann Jg. 1884 deportiert 1942 Auschwitz ermordet		
Eppendorfer Landstraße 18; 53.586156°N 9.983381°E	Alexander Joel	Hier wohnte Alexander Joel Jg. 1871 deportiert 1942 Theresienstadt ermordet 21.12.1942		
Eppendorfer Landstraße 18; 53.586156°N 9.983381°E	Sara Lennhoff	Hier wohnte Sara Lennhoff Jg. 1893 deportiert 1941 Łodz ermordet		
Eppendorfer Landstraße 24; 53.5865456°N 9.9839635°E	Gertrud Jacobsohn	Hier wohnte Gertrud Jacobsohn Jg. 1884 deportiert 1941 Minsk ermordet		
Eppendorfer Landstraße 24; 53.5865607°N 9.9839604°E	Mathilde Meyer	Hier wohnte Mathilde Meyer Jg. 1891 deportiert 1941 Łodz 1942 Chelmno ermordet		
Eppendorfer Landstraße 28; 53.5867612°N 9.9842038°E	‚Eddy Beuth‘ Marie Aronheim (née Cohn)	Hier wohnte ‚Eddy Beuth‘ Marie Aronheim geb. Cohn Jg. 1872 gedemütigt/entrechtet Flucht in den Tod 16.12.1938		
Eppendorfer Landstraße 28; 53.5867564°N 9.9841994°E	Gerda Boas	Hier wohnte Gerda Boas Jg. 1910 deportiert 1941 Łodz ermordet 1944 in Chelmno		
Eppendorfer Landstraße 28; 53.5867612°N 9.9842038°E	Paula Boas	Hier wohnte Paula Boas Jg. 1897 deportiert 1941 Łodz ermordet 1944 in Chelmno		
Eppendorfer Landstraße 28; 53.5867612°N 9.9842038°E	Lisbeth Margot Freund (née Cohn)	Hier wohnte Lisbeth Margot Freund geb. Cohn Jg. 1876 gedemütigt/entrechtet Flucht in den Tod 16.12.1938		Sister of Eddy Beuth
Eppendorfer Landstraße 28; 53.5867612°N 9.9842038°E	Georg Paul	Hier wohnte Georg Paul Jg. 1890 deportiert 1941 Łodz/Litzmannstadt 1944 Chelmno/Kulmhof ermordet 1944		
Eppendorfer Landstraße 28; 53.5867612°N 9.9842038°E	Hedwig Paul (née Münz)	Hier wohnte Hedwig Paul geb. Münz Jg. 1893 deportiert 1941 Łodz/Litzmannstadt 1944 Chelmno/Kulmhof ermordet 1944		
Eppendorfer Landstraße 28; 53.5867612°N 9.9842038°E	Alfred Paul	Hier wohnte Alfred Paul Jg. 1886 ‚Schutzhaft‘ 1938 Sachsenhausen deportiert 1941 Łodz/Litzmannstadt 1944 Chelmno/Kulmhof ermordet 1944		
Eppendorfer Landstraße 28; 53.5867612°N 9.9842038°E	Hilda Paul (née Münz)	Hier wohnte Hilda Paul geb. Münz Jg. 1891 deportiert 1941 Łodz/Litzmannstadt 1944 Chelmno/Kulmhof ermordet 1944		
Eppendorfer Landstraße 30; 53.5868791°N 9.9843351°E	Paul Blumenthal	Hier wohnte Dr. Paul Blumenthal Jg. 1880 deportiert 1941 Minsk ermordet		Another Stolperstein for this person is in Neustadt.
Eppendorfer Landstraße 30; 53.5868912°N 9.9842985°E	Julius Cohn	Hier wohnte Julius Cohn Jg. 1882 deportiert 1941 Łodz ermordet		
Eppendorfer Landstraße 30; 53.5868921°N 9.9842955°E	Gertrud Cohn (née Delmonte)	Hier wohnte Gertrud Cohn geb. Delmonte Jg. 1890 deportiert 1941 Łodz ermordet		
Eppendorfer Landstraße 30; 53.5868826°N 9.9843247°E	Hermann Müller	Hier wohnte Hermann Müller Jg. 1884 deportiert 1941 ermordet 19.4.1942 in Łodz		
Eppendorfer Landstraße 30; 53.5868835°N 9.9843220°E	Meta Müller (née Eichenbronner)	Hier wohnte Meta Müller geb. Eichenbronner Jg. 1883 1933 Gefängnis deportiert 1941 Łodz 1942 Chelmno ???		
Eppendorfer Landstraße 30; 53.5868880°N 9.9843082°E	Erna Polak (née Blumenthal)	Hier wohnte Erna Polak geb. Blumenthal Jg. 1881 deportiert 1941 Minsk ???		
Eppendorfer Landstraße 30; 53.5868870°N 9.9843114°E	Moritz Polak	Hier wohnte Moritz Polak Jg. 1875 deportiert 1941 Minsk ???		
Eppendorfer Landstraße 33; 53.5879018°N 9.9850608°E	Susanne Gertrud Silber	Hier wohnte Susanne Gertrud Silber Jg. 1874 deportiert 1942 Theresienstadt 1944 Auschwitz ermordet		
Eppendorfer Landstraße 36; 53.587206°N 9.984728°E	Hilda Gowa	Hier wohnte Hilda Gowa Jg. 1909 deportiert 1941 Łodz/Litzmannstadt Auschwitz ermordet		Replaced in November 2025 (previous stone)
Eppendorfer Landstraße 36; 53.587206°N 9.984728°E	Renée Gowa	Hier wohnte Renée Gowa Jg. 1933 deportiert 1941 Łodz/Litzmannstadt Auschwitz ermordet		Replaced in November 2025 (previous stone)
Eppendorfer Landstraße 36; 53.587206°N 9.984728°E	Therese Gowa (née Polack)	Hier wohnte Therese Gowa geb. Polack Jg. 1878 deportiert 1941 Łodz/Litzmannstadt ermordet 18.2.1942		Replaced in November 2025 (previous stone)
Eppendorfer Landstraße 36; 53.587206°N 9.984728°E	Elise Hirschfeld (née Weil)	Hier wohnte Elise Hirschfeld geb. Weil Jg. 1870 deportiert 1941 Ghetto Minsk ermordet		Replaced in November 2025 (previous stone)
Eppendorfer Landstraße 36; 53.587206°N 9.984728°E	Wally Rosa Hirschfeld	Hier wohnte Wally Rosa Hirschfeld Jg. 1897 deportiert 1941 Ghetto Minsk ermordet		Replaced in November 2025 (previous stone)
Eppendorfer Landstraße 42; 53.587564°N 9.985053°E	Alice Ekert-Rotholz	Hier wohnte Alice Ekert-Rotholz Jg. 1900 Schutzhaft 6.11.1935 KZ Fuhlsbüttel UG Holstenglacis entlassen 23.2.1936 Flucht 1939 Siam		
Eppendorfer Landstraße 42; 53.587564°N 9.985053°E	Ella Leffmann	Hier wohnte Ella Leffmann Jg. 1865 deportiert 1942 Theresienstadt 1942 Treblinka ermordet		
Eppendorfer Landstraße 42; 53.587564°N 9.985053°E	Louise Leffmann	Hier wohnte Louise Leffmann Jg. 1873 deportiert 1942 Theresienstadt 1942 Treblinka ermordet		
Eppendorfer Landstraße 42; 53.587564°N 9.985053°E	Sophie London	Hier wohnte Sophie London Jg. 1888 deportiert 1942 Theresienstadt 1944 Auschwitz ermordet		
Eppendorfer Landstraße 42; 53.587564°N 9.985053°E	Bertha Neuburger (née Mündheim)	Hier wohnte Bertha Neuburger geb. Mündheim Jg. 1893 verzogen 1931 Holland interniert Westerbork deportiert Auschwitz ermordet 11.2.1944		
Eppendorfer Landstraße 42; 53.587564°N 9.985053°E	Lisa Neuburger	Hier wohnte Lisa Neuburger Jg. 1921 verzogen 1931 Holland interniert Westerbork deportiert 1943 Auschwitz ermordet 31.7.1944		
Eppendorfer Landstraße 42; 53.587564°N 9.985053°E	Max Neuburger	Hier wohnte Max Neuburger Jg. 1889 verzogen 1931 Holland interniert Westerbork deportiert 1943 Auschwitz ermordet		
Eppendorfer Landstraße 42; 53.587564°N 9.985053°E	Stefanie Neuburger	Hier wohnte Stefanie Neuburger Jg. 1923 verzogen 1931 Holland interniert Westerbork deportiert 1943 Auschwitz ermordet 31.7.1944		
Eppendorfer Landstraße 42; 53.587564°N 9.985053°E	Leopold Rotholz	Hier wohnte Dr. Leopold Rotholz Jg. 1893 ‚Schutzhaft‘ 6.11.1935 KZ Fühlsbüttel entlassen 24.12.1935 Flucht 1939 Siam		
Eppendorfer Landstraße 46; 53.5878647°N 9.9855454°E	Alfred Aron	Hier wohnte Alfred Aron Jg. 1886 deportiert 1941 Łodz 1942 Chelmno ???		
Eppendorfer Landstraße 46; 53.5878690°N 9.9855489°E	Bertha Engers (née Valk)	Hier wohnte Bertha Engers geb. Valk Jg. 1866 deportiert 1942 Theresienstadt ermordet 23.7.1943		
Eppendorfer Landstraße 46; 53.5878622°N 9.9855546°E	Bertha Margaretha Haurwitz (née Hauer)	Hier wohnte Bertha Margaretha Haurwitz geb. Hauer Jg. 1873 Freitod 25.10.1941		
Eppendorfer Landstraße 46; 53.5878597°N 9.9855638°E	Rudolf Haurwitz	Hier wohnte Dr. Rudolf Haurwitz Jg. 1901 29.11.1936 Selbstmord		
Eppendorfer Landstraße 46; 53.5878597°N 9.9855638°E	Henriette Hofmann (née Ephraim)	Hier wohnte Henriette Hofmann geb. Ephraim Jg. 1877 deportiert 1941 Minsk ermordet		
Eppendorfer Landstraße 46; 53.5878829°N 9.9854990°E	Martha Markus	Hier wohnte Martha Markus Jg. 1884 deportiert 1941 Łodz ermordet in Chelmno		
Eppendorfer Landstraße 46; 53.5878796°N 9.9854911°E	Siegfried Marcus	Hier wohnte Siegfried Marcus Jg. 1880 deportiert 1941 Łodz ermordet		
Eppendorfer Landstraße 46; 53.5878721°N 9.9855183°E	Elsa Meyerhof (née Müller)	Hier wohnte Elsa Meyerhof geb. Müller Jg. 1875 deportiert 1941 Riga ???		
Eppendorfer Landstraße 46; 53.5878759°N 9.9855239°E	Käte Meyerhof	Hier wohnte Käte Meyerhof Jg. 1898 deportiert 1941 Riga ???		
Eppendorfer Landstraße 46; 53.5878690°N 9.9855489°E	Olga Reyersbach	Hier wohnte Olga Reyersbach Jg. 1885 deportiert 1941 Riga ???		
Eppendorfer Landstraße 49; 53.588786°N 9.986111°E	Karoline Schulz (née Alsberg)	Hier wohnte Karoline Schulz geb. Alsberg Jg. 1881 gedemütigt/entrechtet Flucht in den Tod 28.3.1944		
Eppendorfer Landstraße 56; 53.5884517°N 9.9861665°E	Georg Gerson	Hier wohnte Georg Gerson Jg. 1861 deportiert 1942 Theresienstadt ermordet 14.9.1942		
Eppendorfer Landstraße 56; 53.5884517°N 9.9861665°E	Helene Gerson (née Löwenberg)	Hier wohnte Helene Gerson geb. Löwenberg Jg. 1863 deportiert 1942 Theresienstadt ermordet 4.12.1942		
Eppendorfer Landstraße 56; 53.5884517°N 9.9861665°E	Otto Sussmann	Hier wohnte Otto Sussmann Jg. 1895 verhaftet 1938 KZ Sachsenhausen ermordet 10.12.1938		
Eppendorfer Landstraße 58; 53.588609°N 9.986446°E	Gustav Heinrich Leo	Hier wohnte Dr. Gustav Heinrich Leo Jg. 1868 ermordet durch Medikamentenentzug KZ Fuhlsbüttel		Another Stolperstein for this person is in Winterhude.
Eppendorfer Landstraße 60; 53.588834°N 9.986625°E	Kurt Löwengard	Hier wohnte Kurt Löwengard Jg. 1895 Flucht nach England tot 8.1.1940		
Eppendorfer Landstraße 62; 53.589027°N 9.986797°E	Hannelore Gerstle	Hier wohnte Hannelore Gerstle Jg. 1924 eingewiesen 1934 Pflegeheim Vorwerk 1940 Langenhorn ‚verlegt‘ 23.9.1940 Landes-Pflegeanstalt Brandenburg ermordet Sept. 1940		Another Stolperstein for this person is in Lübeck.
Eppendorfer Landstraße 62; 53.589027°N 9.986797°E	Kurt Silberstein	Hier wohnte Kurt Silberstein Jg. 1898 deportiert 1942 Theresienstadt 1944 Auschwitz ermordet 10.2.1945 im KZ Dachau		Another Stolperstein for this person is in Rotherbaum.
Eppendorfer Landstraße 63; 53.589681°N 9.986813°E	Wilhelm Hirschel	Hier wohnte Wilhelm Hirschel Jg. 1892 deportiert 1945 Theresienstadt befreit		
Eppendorfer Landstraße 64; 53.589242°N 9.986912°E	Erika Bein	Hier wohnte Erika Bein Jg. 1922 deportiert 1941 Minsk ermordet		
Eppendorfer Landstraße 64; 53.589242°N 9.986912°E	Ernst Bein	Hier wohnte Dr. Ernst Bein Jg. 1887 deportiert 1941 Minsk ermordet		
Eppendorfer Landstraße 64; 53.589242°N 9.986912°E	Ursula Lore Bein	Hier wohnte Ursula Lore Bein Jg. 1925 Flucht 1939 Holland interniert 1943 Lager Vught deportiert Auschwitz ermordet 24.9.1943		See also Quaker School Eerde.
Eppendorfer Landstraße 74; 53.589800°N 9.987213°E	Otto Abendstern	Hier wohnte Otto Abendstern Jg. 1904 Flucht Belgien Frankreich interniert Drancy deportiert 1942 Auschwitz ermordet 24.9.1942		
Eppendorfer Landstraße 74; 53.589800°N 9.987213°E	Hermann Hoefer	Hier wohnte Hermann Hoefer Jg. 1868 verhaftet 1944 Zuchthaus Coswig/Anhalt tot an Haftfolgen 13.12.1945		Another Stolperstein for this person is in Altstadt.
Eppendorfer Landstraße 84; 53.590592°N 9.987591°E	Heinz Adolf Abrahamssohn	Hier wohnte Heinz Adolf Abrahamssohn Jg. 1923 deportiert 1941 Łodz ermordet 23.3.1943		See also Haynstraße 36.
Eppendorfer Landstraße 84; 53.590592°N 9.987591°E	Thekla Abrahamssohn (née Abel)	Hier wohnte Thekla Abrahamssohn geb. Abel Jg. 1890 deportiert 1941 Łodz ermordet 11.4.1943		
Eppendorfer Landstraße 84; 53.590592°N 9.987591°E	Max Lippmann	Hier wohnte Max Lippmann Jg. 1873 deportiert 1942 Theresienstadt 1942 Treblinka ermordet		Another Stolperstein for this person is in Winterhude.
Eppendorfer Landstraße 84; 53.590592°N 9.987591°E	Tony Lippmann (née Cohn)	Hier wohnte Tony Lippmann geb. Cohn Jg. 1873 deportiert 1942 Theresienstadt 1942 Treblinka ermordet		
Eppendorfer Landstraße 84; 53.590592°N 9.987591°E	Hedwig Rosenberg (née Eckstein)	Hier wohnte Hedwig Rosenberg geb. Eckstein Jg. 1870 deportiert 1943 Theresienstadt ermordet 25.6.1943		
Eppendorfer Landstraße 86; 53.590723°N 9.987658°E	Bernhard Goslar	Hier wohnte Bernhard Goslar Jg. 1881 Flucht interniert Drancy deportiert 1943 Majdanek ermordet		
Eppendorfer Landstraße 86; 53.590723°N 9.987658°E	Ruth Riess (née Goslar)	Hier wohnte Ruth Riess geb. Goslar Jg. 1912 Flucht 1933 Frankreich interniert Drancy deportiert 1942 ermordet in Auschwitz		
Eppendorfer Landstraße 92; 53.591491°N 9.988141°E	Gertrud Heymann (née Heymann)	Hier wohnte Gertrud Heymann geb. Heymann Jg. 1882 deportiert 1942 Theresienstadt 1942 Treblinka ermordet		
Eppendorfer Landstraße 92; 53.591491°N 9.988141°E	Gustav Heymann	Hier wohnte Gustav Heymann Jg. 1871 deportiert 1942 Theresienstadt 1942 Treblinka ermordet		
Eppendorfer Landstraße 93; 53.5920567°N 9.9877389°E	Ada Seligmann (née Löwenstein)	Hier wohnte Ada Seligmann geb. Löwenstein Jg. 1894 deportiert 1942 Auschwitz 1944 ermordet		
Eppendorfer Landstraße 93; 53.5920551°N 9.9877438°E	Ellen Ruth Seligmann	Hier wohnte Ellen Ruth Seligmann Jg. 1923 deportiert 1942 Theresienstadt Auschwitz 1944 ermordet		
Eppendorfer Landstraße 93; 53.5920533°N 9.9877363°E	Jacob Seligmann	Hier wohnte Jacob Seligmann Jg. 1881 deportiert 1942 Theresienstadt Auschwitz 1944 ermordet		
Eppendorfer Landstraße 98; 53.5916789°N 9.9881824°E	Martha Löwenberg	Hier wohnte Martha Löwenberg Jg. 1861 deportiert 1942 Theresienstadt ermordet 5.11.1942		
Eppendorfer Landstraße 132; 53.5936341°N 9.9884199°E	Friedrich Gevert	Hier wohnte Friedrich Gevert Jg. 1899 verhaftet 1942 Strafgefängnis Wolfenbüttel tot 22.4.1945		
Eppendorfer Landstraße 132; 53.5936344°N 9.9884171°E	Eva Petersen	Hier wohnte Eva Petersen Jg. 1921 verhaftet KZ Fuhlsbüttel deportiert Ravensbrück ermordet 1942 in Auschwitz		
Erikastraße 79; 53.5956615°N 9.9871932°E	Alfred Bielefeld	Hier wohnte Alfred Bielefeld Jg. 1874 deportiert 1941 Minsk ermordet		
Erikastraße 79; 53.5956662°N 9.9871937°E	Helene Bielefeld (née Cohn)	Hier wohnte Helene Bielefeld geb. Cohn Jg. 1878 deportiert 1941 Minsk ermordet		
Erikastraße 96; 53.596030°N 9.987390°E	Alice de Sola (née Pardo)	Hier wohnte Alice de Sola geb. Pardo Jg. 1878 Flucht 1938 Holland interniert Westerbork deportiert 1944 Theresienstadt ermordet 30.12.1944 Bergen-Belsen		
Erikastraße 96; 53.596030°N 9.987390°E	Helen de Sola	Hier wohnte Helen de Sola Jg. 1905 Flucht 1938 Holland interniert Westerbork deportiert 1944 Theresienstadt ermordet 15.2.1945 Bergen-Belsen		
Erikastraße 96; 53.596030°N 9.987390°E	Hilda de Sola	Hier wohnte Hilda de Sola Jg. 1905 Flucht 1938 Holland interniert Westerbork deportiert 1944 Theresienstadt ermordet 12.2.1945 Bergen-Belsen		
Frickestraße 24; 53.5927410°N 9.9794977°E	Lilly Bauer (née Riess)	Hier wohnte Lilly Bauer geb. Riess Jg. 1881 deportiert 1941 Minsk ???		
Frickestraße 24; 53.5927393°N 9.9795012°E	Roland Behrend	Hier wohnte Dr. Roland Behrend Jg. 1875 deportiert 1942 Theresienstadt ermordet 22.3.1943		Another Stolperstein for this person is in Harvestehude.
Frickestraße 24; 53.5927428°N 9.9794937°E	Erika Levy (née Bos)	Hier wohnte Erika Levy geb. Bos Jg. 1892 deportiert 1941 Riga ???		
Geffckenstraße 6; 53.5862009°N 9.9932512°E	Robert Bachmann	Hier wohnte Dr. Robert Bachmann Jg. 1883 1942 KZ Fuhlsbüttel deportiert 1942 Auschwitz		Another Stolperstein for this person is in Harvestehude.
Geffckenstraße 6; 53.5861901°N 9.9932512°E	Nelly Juda	Hier wohnte Nelly Juda Jg. 1887 deportiert 1941 Łodz weiterdeportiert ???		
Geffckenstraße 6; 53.5862225°N 9.9932512°E	Friedrich Stern	Hier wohnte Friedrich Stern Jg. 1890 deportiert 1941 Minsk ???		
Geffckenstraße 6; 53.5862117°N 9.9932512°E	Mathilde Stern (née Grünebaum)	Hier wohnte Mathilde Stern geb. Grünebaum Jg. 1892 deportiert 1941 Minsk ???		
Geffckenstraße 15; 53.5866191°N 9.9927802°E	Eduard Pulvermann	Hier wohnte Eduard Pulvermann Jg. 1882 Gestapohaft ermordet 9.4.1944 KZ Neuengamme		
Geffckenstraße 23; 53.5872315°N 9.9923018°E	Rosalie Arendt	Hier wohnte Rosalie Arendt Jg. 1867 deportiert 1942 Theresienstadt tot an Haftfolgen 1945		
Geffckenstraße 30; 53.587230°N 9.992580°E	Alba Anna Franzius (née Silbiger)	Hier wohnte Alba Anna Franzius geb. Silbiger Jg. 1879 gedemütigt/entrechtet Flucht in den Tod 12.12.1941		
Geschwister-Scholl-Straße 56; 53.594468°N 9.982951°E	Walter Schulz	Hier wohnte Walter Schulz Jg. 1928 verhaftet 8.10.1943 Gefängnis Herford tot 10. Mai 1945		
Geschwister-Scholl-Straße 64; 53.594466°N 9.982082°E	Hans Emil Bajohr	Hier wohnte Hans Emil Bajohr Jg. 1890 verhaftet 19.2.1944 ‚Vorbereitung Hochverrat‘ Gefängnis Fuhlsbüttel Neuengamme ermordet April 1945		
Geschwister-Scholl-Straße 71; 53.5942966°N 9.9816270°E	Max Mordechai Nadel	Hier wohnte Max Mordechai Nadel Jg. 1884 verhaftet 1938 Gefängnis Hamburg deportiert Auschwitz ermordet 13.2.1943		
Geschwister-Scholl-Straße 71; 53.5942966°N 9.9816222°E	Siegfried Nadel	Hier wohnte Siegfried Nadel Jg. 1903 verhaftet 1939 KZ Sachsenhausen ermordet 8.10.1942		
Geschwister-Scholl-Straße 94; 53.594457°N 9.980032°E	August Bruns	Hier wohnte August Bruns Jg. 1909 im Widerstand/KPD verhaftet 23.2.1935 KZ Fuhlsbüttel Esterwegen, Börgermoor 1942 Strafbataillon 999 überlebt		
Geschwister-Scholl-Straße 131; 53.594310°N 9.977754°E	Luise von der Heide (née Lorenz)	Hier wohnte Luise von der Heide geb. Lorenz Jg. 1905 eingewiesen 1942 Heilanstalt Langenhorn ‚verlegt‘ 29.6.1943 Heilanstalt Hadamar ermordet 29.6.1944		
Goernestraße 2; 53.590015°N 9.987603°E	Gerd Cohn	Hier wohnte Gerd Cohn Jg. 1926 deportiert 1941 Minsk 1944 Flossenbürg ermordet		
Goernestraße 2; 53.590015°N 9.987603°E	Otto Cohn	Hier wohnte Otto Cohn Jg. 1898 deportiert 1941 ermordet in Minsk		
Goernestraße 2; 53.590015°N 9.987603°E	Vera Cohn	Hier wohnte Vera Cohn Jg. 1928 deportiert 1941 ermordet in Minsk		
Goernestraße 4; 53.589940°N 9.987792°E	Sophie Hess (née Hess)	Hier wohnte Sophie Hess geb. Hess Jg. 1876 gedemütigt/entrechtet Flucht in den Tod 21.11.1941		
Goernestraße 4; 53.589940°N 9.987792°E	Fredy Norbert Wiener	Hier wohnte Fredy Norbert Wiener Jg. 1901 Flucht 1933 Palästina		
Goernestraße 4; 53.589940°N 9.987792°E	Kurt Egon Wiener	Hier wohnte Kurt Egon Wiener Jg. 1903 Flucht 1933 Palästina		
Goernestraße 6; 53.5897988°N 9.9881574°E	Anna Caspary (née Lychenheim)	Hier wohnte Anna Caspary geb. Lychenheim Jg. 1880 Flucht 1939 Belgien interniert Mechelen deportiert 1943 ermordet in Auschwitz		
Goernestraße 8; 53.589686°N 9.988379°E	Eugenie Brückmann (née Seckel)	Hier wohnte Eugenie Brückmann geb. Seckel Jg. 1868 gedemütigt/entrechtet Flucht in den Tod 14.7.1942		
Goernestraße 8; 53.589686°N 9.988379°E	Selma Sommerfeld (née Joachimczyk)	Hier wohnte Selma Sommerfeld geb. Joachimczyk Jg. 1871 deportiert 1942 Theresienstadt ermordet 22.1.1943		
Goernestraße 10; 53.5896309°N 9.9886205°E	Berta Bernhardt (née Katz)	Hier wohnte Berta Bernhardt geb. Katz Jg. 1884 deportiert 1941 Łodz/Litzmannstadt Chelmno/Kulmhof ermordet 10.5.1942		
Goernestraße 10; 53.5896309°N 9.9886205°E	Irma Holländer (née Lagus)	Hier wohnte Irma Holländer geb. Lagus Jg. 1897 deportiert 1941 Łodz ermordet in Chelmno		
Goernestraße 12; 53.589522°N 9.988844°E	Hugo Henle	Hier wohnte Hugo Henle Jg. 1883 deportiert 1942 Theresienstadt ermordet 16.9.1942		
Goernestraße 12; 53.589522°N 9.988844°E	Martha Hesse (née Baruch)	Hier wohnte Martha Hesse geb. Baruch Jg. 1908 deportiert 1943 Bergen-Belsen ermordet 1.3.1945		
Goernestraße 12; 53.589522°N 9.988844°E	Nathan Hesse	Hier wohnte Nathan Hesse Jg. 1905 deportiert 1943 Bergen-Belsen ermordet 19.1.1945		
Gustav-Leo-Straße 2; 53.5892527°N 9.9874623°E	Elfriede Ellen Benjamin (née Cohn)	Hier wohnte Elfriede Ellen Benjamin geb. Cohn Jg. 1912 deportiert 1942 Theresienstadt ermordet		
Gustav-Leo-Straße 2; 53.5892429°N 9.9874627°E	Jardena Benjamin	Hier wohnte Jardena Benjamin Jg. 1932 deportiert 1942 Theresienstadt 1944 Auschwitz ermordet		
Gustav-Leo-Straße 2; 53.5892332°N 9.9874631°E	Ruben Benjamin	Hier wohnte Ruben Benjamin Jg. 1934 deportiert 1942 Theresienstadt 1944 Auschwitz ermordet		
Gustav-Leo-Straße 4; 53.5891545°N 9.9877056°E	Anna Rosenbaum	Hier wohnte Anna Rosenbaum Jg. 1893 deportiert 1941 Łodz 1942 weiterdeportiert ermordet		
Gustav-Leo-Straße 4; 53.5891629°N 9.9877063°E	Anna Schönfeld (née Falk)	Hier wohnte Anna Schönfeld geb. Falk Jg. 1875 deportiert 1942 Theresienstadt ermordet 21.3.1943		
Gustav-Leo-Straße 4; 53.5891714°N 9.9877069°E	Felix-Manfred Schönfeld	Hier wohnte Felix-Manfred Schönfeld Jg. 1869 deportiert 1942 Theresienstadt ermordet 27.12.1942		
Gustav-Leo-Straße 7; 53.5891619°N 9.9879187°E	Manfred Heckscher	Hier wohnte Dr. Manfred Heckscher Jg. 1886 Haft 1939–1942 Zuchthaus Fuhlsbüttel deportiert 1942 Auschwitz ermordet 10.1.1943		
Gustav-Leo-Straße 9; 53.5890430°N 9.9882086°E	Agathe Lasch	Hier wohnte Dr. Agathe Lasch Jg. 1879 verhaftet Haft in Berlin deportiert 1942 Riga ermordet 18.8.1942		Further Stolpersteine for this person are in Rotherbaum and Schmargendorf.
Gustav-Leo-Straße 14; 53.5889980°N 9.9888626°E	Ludwig Leo Jacobson	Hier wohnte Ludwig Leo Jacobson Jg. 1895 Flucht 1938 Holland deportiert 1943 Auschwitz ermordet		
Haynstraße 1; 53.5853963°N 9.9859881°E	Elsa Schickler (née Berg)	Hier wohnte Elsa Schickler geb. Berg Jg. 1877 deportiert 1941 ermordet in Riga		
Haynstraße 1; 53.5853810°N 9.9859905°E	Paula Sternberg	Hier wohnte Paula Sternberg Jg. 1867 deportiert 1942 Theresienstadt ermordet 1942 Minsk		
Haynstraße 2; 53.5856022°N 9.9860183°E	Betty Oettinger (née Ettinghausen)	Hier wohnte Betty Oettinger geb. Ettinghausen Jg. 1907 Flucht 1933 Holland interniert Westerbork deportiert 1944 Theresienstadt 1944 Auschwitz ermordet		
Haynstraße 2; 53.5855941°N 9.9860191°E	Ellinor Oettinger	Hier wohnte Ellinor Oettinger Jg. 1929 Flucht 1933 Holland interniert Westerbork deportiert 1944 Theresienstadt 1944 Auschwitz ermordet		
Haynstraße 2; 53.5856104°N 9.9860175°E	Herbert Oettinger	Hier wohnte Herbert Oettinger Jg. 1896 Flucht 1933 Holland interniert Westerbork deportiert 1944 Theresienstadt 1944 Auschwitz ermordet		
Haynstraße 2; 53.5855859°N 9.9860199°E	Ralf Joseph Oettinger	Hier wohnte Ralf Joseph Oettinger Jg. 1933 geboren in Holland interniert Westerbork deportiert 1944 Theresienstadt 1944 Auschwitz ermordet		
Haynstraße 5; 53.5856766°N 9.9852930°E	Liselotte Brinitzer	Hier wohnte Liselotte Brinitzer Jg 1921 Flucht 1939 Holland versteckt gelebt befreit		
Haynstraße 5; 53.5856766°N 9.9852930°E	Fanny David	Hier wohnte Fanny David Jg. 1892 deportiert 1943 Theresienstadt ermordet in Auschwitz		Another Stolperstein for this person is in Uhlenhorst.
Haynstraße 5; 53.5856651°N 9.9852927°E	Arno Glassmann	Hier wohnte Arno Glassmann Jg. 1898 deportiert 1941 Minsk ???		
Haynstraße 5; 53.5856766°N 9.9852930°E	Kurt Glassmann	Hier wohnte Kurt Glassmann Jg. 1900 eingewiesen 1940 Heilanstalt Langenhorn ‚verlegt‘ 23.9.1940 Brandenburg ermordet 23.9.1940 ‚Aktion T4‘		
Haynstraße 5; 53.5856766°N 9.9852930°E	Helene Herzberg (née Hope)	Hier wohnte Helene Herzberg geb. Hope Jg. 1867 Flucht 1939 Holland interniert Westerbork deportiert 1943 Sobibor ermordet 23.7.1943		
Haynstraße 5; 53.5856880°N 9.9852934°E	Jacob Holz	Hier wohnte Jacob Holz Jg. 1874 deportiert 1941 Riga ???		
Haynstraße 5; 53.5856823°N 9.9852932°E	Eleonore Holz (née Reiss)	Hier wohnte Eleonore Holz geb. Reiss Jg. 1882 deportiert 1941 Riga ???		
Haynstraße 5; 53.5856766°N 9.9852930°E	Antonie Fanny Riess (née Popert)	Hier wohnte Antonie Fanny Riess geb. Popert Jg. 1875 gedemütigt/entrechtet Flucht in den Tod 25.3.1942		
Haynstraße 5; 53.5856594°N 9.9852925°E	Helma Wehl	Hier wohnte Helma Wehl Jg. 1907 deportiert 1941 Riga weiterdeportiert KZ Stutthof ???		
Haynstraße 5; 53.5856708°N 9.9852928°E	Irma Zancker (née David)	Hier wohnte Irma Zancker geb. David Jg. 1901 deportiert 1943 Theresienstadt 1944 Auschwitz		Another Stolperstein for this person is in Winterhude.
Haynstraße 7; 53.5857355°N 9.9850660°E	Gertrud Blut	Hier wohnte Gertrud Blut Jg. 1889 1941 KZ Fuhlsbüttel deportiert 1941 Minsk ???		
Haynstraße 7; 53.5857364°N 9.9850755°E	Hannchen Fromme (née Hoffmann)	Hier wohnte Hannchen Fromme geb. Hoffmann Jg. 1878 deportiert 1941 Minsk ermordet		
Haynstraße 7; 53.5857314°N 9.9850812°E	Bianca Levy (née von Halle)	Hier wohnte Bianca Levy geb. von Halle Jg. 1882 deportiert 1941 Riga ermordet		
Haynstraße 7; 53.5857332°N 9.9850746°E	Ilse Victor (née Abraham)	Hier wohnte Ilse Victor geb. Abraham Jg. 1900 Flucht 1937 Holland interniert Westerbork deportiert 1943 Sobibor ermordet		
Haynstraße 7; 53.5857314°N 9.9850774°E	Manfred Victor	Hier wohnte Manfred Victor Jg. 1886 Flucht 1937 Holland interniert Westerbork deportiert 1943 Sobibor ermordet		
Haynstraße 8; 53.5857350°N 9.9855250°E	Erich Rosenberg	Hier wohnte Erich Rosenberg Jg. 1924 deportiert 1941 ermordet in Riga		
Haynstraße 8; 53.5857405°N 9.9855259°E	Hellmuth Rosenberg	Hier wohnte Hellmuth Rosenberg Jg. 1921 deportiert 1941 ermordet in Łodz		
Haynstraße 8; 53.5857459°N 9.9855267°E	Julius Rosenberg	Hier wohnte Julius Rosenberg Jg. 1880 gedemütigt/entrechtet Flucht in den Tod 28.4.1940		
Haynstraße 9; 53.58587°N 9.984746°E	Alfred Behr	Hier wohnte Alfred Behr Jg. 1902 gedemütigt/entrechtet Flucht 1939 USA		
Haynstraße 9; 53.58587°N 9.984746°E	Claus Behr	Hier wohnte Claus Behr Jg. 1926 gedemütigt/entrechtet Kindertransport 1939 England		
Haynstraße 9; 53.58587°N 9.984746°E	Edith Behr (née Baruch)	Hier wohnte Edith Behr geb. Baruch Jg. 1908 gedemütigt/entrechtet Flucht 1939 USA		
Haynstraße 9; 53.58587°N 9.984746°E	Ursel Behr	Hier wohnte Ursel Behr Jg. 1924 gedemütigt/entrechtet Kindertransport 1939 England		
Haynstraße 9; 53.58587°N 9.984746°E	Käthe Goldschmidt	Hier wohnte Käthe Goldschmidt Jg. 1902 deportiert 1942 ermordet in Auschwitz		
Haynstraße 9; 53.58587°N 9.984746°E	Elisa Groth (née Goldschmidt)	Hier wohnte Elisa Groth geb. Goldschmidt Jg. 1882 deportiert 1942 ermordet in Auschwitz		
Haynstraße 9; 53.58587°N 9.984746°E	Kurt Henry Teitelbaum (née Goldschmidt)	Hier wohnte Kurt Henry Teitelbaum Jg. 1923 Kindertransport 1939 Schottland		
Haynstraße 10; 53.585811°N 9.985322°E	Gertrud Brühl (née Treumann)	Hier wohnte Gertrud Brühl geb. Treumann Jg. 1870 deportiert 1942 Theresienstadt ermordet 23.8.1942		
Haynstraße 10; 53.585811°N 9.985322°E	Wilhelm Cohn	Hier wohnte Wilhelm Cohn Jg. 1873 gedemütigt/entrechtet Flucht in den Tod 15.7.1942		
Haynstraße 10; 53.585811°N 9.985322°E	Olga Delbanco	Hier wohnte Olga Delbanco Jg. 1876 deportiert 1941 Minsk ermordet		
Haynstraße 10; 53.585811°N 9.985322°E	Hermann Falkenstein	Hier wohnte Hermann Falkenstein Jg. 1894 Haft 1939–40 Fuhlsbüttel Haft 1940–43 Bremen Bützow-Dreibergen ermordet 30.1.1943 Auschwitz		
Haynstraße 10; 53.585811°N 9.985322°E	Josefine Holländer (née Israel)	Hier wohnte Josefine Holländer geb. Israel Jg. 1874 deportiert 1942 Theresienstadt ermordet 3.5.1944		
Haynstraße 10; 53.585811°N 9.985322°E	Fanny Kallmes (née Nathan)	Hier wohnte Fanny Kallmes geb. Nathan Jg. 1871 gedemütigt/entrechtet Flucht in den Tod 16.7.1942		
Haynstraße 10; 53.585811°N 9.985322°E	Elfriede Ruben	Hier wohnte Elfriede Ruben Jg. 1885 deportiert 1941 Łodz ermordet in Chelmno		
Haynstraße 11; 53.5859563°N 9.9845375°E	Erich Siegfried Frensdorff	Hier wohnte Erich Siegfried Frensdorff Jg. 1924 deportiert 1941 Łodz weiterdeportiert ermordet		
Haynstraße 11; 53.5859575°N 9.9845304°E	Lilly Frensdorff (née Ballin)	Hier wohnte Lilly Frensdorff geb. Ballin Jg. 1894 deportiert 1941 Łodz weiterdeportiert ermordet		
Haynstraße 11; 53.5859550°N 9.9845456°E	Louis Frensdorff	Hier wohnte Louis Frensdorff Jg. 1894 deportiert 1941 Łodz ermordet 5.4.1942		
Haynstraße 11; 53.5859472°N 9.9845403°E	Alfred Leven	Hier wohnte Alfred Leven Jg. 1902 deportiert 1941 Łodz weiterdeportiert ???		
Haynstraße 11; 53.5859519°N 9.9845260°E	Inge Leven (née Frensdorff)	Hier wohnte Inge Leven geb. Frensdorff Jg. 1921 deportiert 1941 Łodz weiterdeportiert ???		
Haynstraße 11; 53.5859496°N 9.9845328°E	Tana Leven	Hier wohnte Tana Leven Jg. 1940 deportiert 1941 Łodz 1942 weiterdeportiert ???		
Haynstraße 13; 53.586053°N 9.984297°E	Gertrud Abraham	Hier wohnte Gertrud Abraham Jg. 1898 Flucht 1939 Holland interniert Westerbork deportiert 1942 Auschwitz ermordet		
Haynstraße 13; 53.586053°N 9.984297°E	Jeanette Abraham (née Porges)	Hier wohnte Jeanette Abraham geb. Porges Jg. 1862 Flucht 1938 Holland interniert Westerbork deportiert 1943 Sobibor ermordet		
Haynstraße 13; 53.586053°N 9.984297°E	Helene Israel (née David)	Hier wohnte Helene Israel geb. David Jg. 1896 deportiert 1941 ermordet in Minsk		
Haynstraße 13; 53.586053°N 9.984297°E	Ida Levy (née Winterberger)	Hier wohnte Ida Levy geb. Winterberger Jg. 1883 deportiert 1942 Theresienstadt 1942 Treblinka ermordet		
Haynstraße 13; 53.586053°N 9.984297°E	Ludwig Levy	Hier wohnte Ludwig Levy Jg. 1875 ‚Schutzhaft‘ 1938 KZ Sachsenhausen deportiert 1942 Theresienstadt Treblinka ermordet 1942		
Haynstraße 15; 53.586122°N 9.984078°E	Gertrud Becher (née Thilo)	Hier wohnte Gertrud Becher geb. Thilo Jg. 1884 deportiert 1941 Riga ???		See also Beim Andreasbrunnen 9.
Haynstraße 15; 53.586122°N 9.984078°E	Rosa Levy (née Levien)	Hier wohnte Rosa Levy geb. Levien Jg. 1869 deportiert 1942 Theresienstadt ermordet in Treblinka		
Haynstraße 15; 53.586122°N 9.984078°E	Benny ‚Benno‘ Nathan	Hier wohnte Benny ‚Benno‘ Nathan Jg. 1874 deportiert 1941 Riga ermordet		
Haynstraße 15; 53.586122°N 9.984078°E	Bernhard Nathan	Hier wohnte Bernhard Nathan Jg. 1904 1944 Arbeitslager Bismarckhütte ???		
Haynstraße 15; 53.586122°N 9.984078°E	Käthe Nathan (née Meier)	Hier wohnte Käthe Nathan geb. Meier Jg. 1891 deportiert 1941 Riga ???		
Haynstraße 19; 53.586727°N 9.983025°E	Ida Heymann	Hier wohnte Ida Heymann Jg. 1877 gedemütigt/entrechtet Flucht in den Tod 7.11.1941		
Haynstraße 19; 53.586727°N 9.983025°E	Bernhard Heymann	Hier wohnte Bernhard Heymann Jg. 1878 gedemütigt/entrechtet Flucht in den Tod 7.11.1941		
Haynstraße 19; 53.586727°N 9.983025°E	Bertha Heymann	Hier wohnte Bertha Heymann Jg. 1875 gedemütigt/entrechtet Flucht in den Tod 7.11.1941		
Haynstraße 21; 53.586709°N 9.983023°E	Adolf ‚Adi‘ Ambor	Hier wohnte Adolf ‚Adi‘ Ambor Jg. 1917 emigriert Frankreich deportiert 1943 verschollen in Majdanek		
Haynstraße 25; 53.5875637°N 9.9818168°E	Hans-Joachim Kubel	Hier wohnte Hans-Joachim Kubel Jg. 1905 deportiert KZ Lublin ermordet 4.3.1944		
Haynstraße 26; 53.5867760°N 9.9831761°E	Moritz Blumenthal	Hier wohnte Moritz Blumenthal Jg. 1879 Flucht Frankreich deportiert 1942 Auschwitz ermordet		
Haynstraße 29; 53.5881345°N 9.9810684°E	Helene Freund (née Pincus)	Hier wohnte Helene Freund geb. Pincus Jg. 1876 deportiert 1942 Theresienstadt 1942 Treblinka ermordet		
Haynstraße 29; 53.5881321°N 9.9810715°E	Hermann Freund	Hier wohnte Hermann Freund Jg. 1872 deportiert 1942 Theresienstadt 1942 Treblinka ermordet		
Haynstraße 29; 53.5881321°N 9.9810715°E	Lothar Freund	Hier wohnte Dr. Lothar Freund Jg. 1903 Flucht 1933 Frankreich interniert Drancy deportiert 1942 ermordet in Auschwitz		
Haynstraße 29; 53.5881321°N 9.9810715°E	Euphrosine Jaques	Hier wohnte Euphrosine Jaques Jg. 1871 deportiert 1942 Theresienstadt tot 28.1.1944		
Haynstraße 29; 53.5881337°N 9.9810750°E	Hedwig Rosskamm	Hier wohnte Hedwig Rosskamm Jg. 1881 deportiert 1941 Łodz ermordet 27.5.1942		
Haynstraße 32; 53.587766°N 9.982058°E	Selma Horwitz (née Levy)	Hier wohnte Selma Horwitz geb. Levy Jg. 1877 deportiert 1941 Lodz/Litzmannstadt ermordet 13.7.1942		
Haynstraße 32; 53.587766°N 9.982058°E	Joseph Levy	Hier wohnte Joseph Levy Jg. 1872 eingewiesen 1928 Heilanstalt Langenhorn ‚verlegt‘ 26.9.1940 Brandenburg ermordet 23.9.1940 ‚Aktion T4‘		
Haynstraße 32; 53.587766°N 9.982058°E	Bertha Strauss (née Levy)	Hier wohnte Bertha Strauss geb. Levy verw. Bloch Jg. 1879 deportiert 1941 Lodz/Litzmannstadt ermordet		
Haynstraße 33; 53.588522°N 9.980627°E	Hilda Lippmann (née Bock)	Hier wohnte Hilda Lippmann geb. Bock Jg. 1896 deportiert 1941 Riga ermordet		
Haynstraße 36; 53.5880682°N 9.9815616°E	Heinz Adolf Abrahamssohn	Hier wohnte Heinz Adolf Abrahamsohn Jg. 1923 deportiert 1941 Łodz ermordet 23.3.1943		Surname misspelled on the stone. See also Eppendorfer Landstraße 84.
Hegestieg 1; 53.5853148°N 9.9833871°E	Ella Braunschweiger	Hier wohnte Ella Braunschweiger Jg. 1891 deportiert 1941 Łodz-Chelmno ermordet 11.9.1942		
Hegestieg 1; 53.5853057°N 9.9833871°E	Liselotte Braunschweiger	Hier wohnte Liselotte Braunschweiger Jg. 1923 deportiert 1941 Łodz ???		
Hegestieg 1; 53.5853239°N 9.9833871°E	Marcus Braunschweiger	Hier wohnte Marcus Braunschweiger Jg. 1880 deportiert 1941 Łodz 1941 weiterdep. ???		
Hegestieg 12; 53.584962°N 9.983702°E	Aron Leopold Müller	Hier wohnte Aron Leopold Müller Jg. 1891 ‚Schutzhaft‘ 1938 KZ Sachsenhausen gedemütigt/entrechtet Flucht 1941 USA tot 21.8.1942		
Hegestieg 12; 53.584962°N 9.983702°E	Marianne Müller (née Polack)	Hier wohnte Marianne Müller geb. Polack Jg. 1893 deportiert 1941 Riga-Jungfernhof ermordet		
Hegestieg 12; 53.584962°N 9.983702°E	Minna Müller (née Engel)	Hier wohnte Minna Müller geb. Engel Jg. 1862 deportiert 1943 Theresienstadt ermordet 18.2.1944		
Hegestieg 14; 53.5847751°N 9.9839298°E	Wilhelm Bock	Hier wohnte Wilhelm Bock Jg. 1886 verhaftet 1938 ‚Hochverrat‘ 1938 Gefängnis Fuhlsbüttel 1940 Sachsenhausen ermordet 21.8.1940		Another Stolperstein for this person is in St. Georg.
Hegestieg 14; 53.5847751°N 9.9839298°E	Charlotte Fraenkel	Hier wohnte Charlotte Fraenkel geb. Levy Jg. 1885 deportiert 1942 Theresienstadt tot 26.11.1943		
Hegestieg 14; 53.5847751°N 9.9839298°E	Ernst Fraenkel	Hier wohnte Dr. Ernst Fraenkel Jg. 1872 deportiert 1942 Theresienstadt tot 16.6.1943		Another Stolperstein for this person is in Hohenfelde.
Hegestraße 27; 53.5843307°N 9.9834255°E	Flora Joseph (née Liepmann)	Hier wohnte Flora Joseph geb. Liepmann Jg. 1866 deportiert 1942 Theresienstadt ermordet 21.8.1942		
Hegestraße 27; 53.5843359°N 9.9834273°E	Gustav Rosenstein	Hier wohnte Gustav Rosenstein Jg. 1881 deportiert 1941 Łodz ermordet 6.3.1942		
Hegestraße 27; 53.5843307°N 9.9834255°E	Emilie Lilly Rosenstein (née Joseph)	Hier wohnte Emilie Lilly Rosenstein geb. Joseph Jg. 1886 deportiert 1941 Łodz ???		
Hegestraße 27; 53.5843411°N 9.9834292°E	Lilly Windmüller	Hier wohnte Lilly Windmüller Jg. 1904 deportiert 1941 Łodz ???		
Hegestraße 39; 53.585028°N 9.985169°E	Ernst Goldschmidt	Hier wohnte Ernst Goldschmidt Jg. 1875 deportiert 1941 Riga ???		
Hegestraße 39; 53.585028°N 9.985169°E	Henriette Meidner	Hier wohnte Henriette Meidner Jg. 1858 deportiert 1942 Theresienstadt ermordet 4.10.1942		
Hegestraße 39; 53.585028°N 9.985169°E	Gertrud Ruppin (née Windmüller)	Hier wohnte Gertrud Ruppin geb. Windmüller Jg. 1885 deportiert 1941 Riga ???		
Hegestraße 39; 53.585028°N 9.985169°E	Rosalie Strauss (née Cramer)	Hier wohnte Rosalie Strauss geb. Cramer Jg. 1858 deportiert 1943 Theresienstadt ermordet 2.12.1943		
Hegestraße 39; 53.585028°N 9.985169°E	Egele Windmüller	Hier wohnte Egele Windmüller Jg. 1877 entrechtet/gedemütigt Flucht in den Tod 25.10.1941		
Hegestraße 39; 53.585028°N 9.985169°E	Franz Wolff	Hier wohnte Franz Wolff Jg. 1865 deportiert 1942 Theresienstadt ermordet 7.6.1943		
Hegestraße 39; 53.585028°N 9.985169°E	Luise Wolff (née Burchard)	Hier wohnte Luise Wolff geb. Burchard Jg. 1878 deportiert 1942 Theresienstadt 1944 Auschwitz ermordet		
Hegestraße 41; 53.5851431°N 9.9855690°E	John Kronach	Hier wohnte John Kronach Jg. 1874 Freitod 14.7.1942		
Heilwigstraße 134; 53.588961°N 9.995978°E	Ernst Cramer	Hier wohnte Ernst Cramer Jg. 1878 gedemütigt/entrechtet Flucht in den Tod 24.2.1939		
Husumer Straße 33; 53.587420°N 9.979888°E	Isaac Meyer	Hier wohnte Isaac Meyer Jg. 1865 gedemütigt/entrechtet tot 12.2.1941 vor Deportation		
Husumer Straße 33; 53.587420°N 9.979888°E	Jenny Meyer (née Aron)	Hier wohnte Jenny Meyer geb. Aron Jg. 1877 deportiert 1941 ermordet in Riga		
Husumer Straße 37; 53.5877981°N 9.9809100°E	Bertha Beschütz (née Eichenholz)	Hier wohnte Bertha Beschütz geb. Eichenholz Jg. 1850 tot 13.12.1941 in Hamburg		Another Stolperstein for this person is in Eimsbüttel.
Husumer Straße 37; 53.5877924°N 9.9808969°E	Clara Beschütz	Hier wohnte Clara Beschütz Jg. 1877 deportiert 1941 Riga ???		
Husumer Straße 37; 53.5877962°N 9.9809056°E	Marie Beschütz	Hier wohnte Marie Beschütz Jg. 1882 deportiert 1941 Riga ???		
Husumer Straße 37; 53.5877943°N 9.9809013°E	Olga Beschütz	Hier wohnte Olga Beschütz Jg. 1876 deportiert 1941 Riga ???		
Im Tale 4; 53.595893°N 9.981875°E	Erna Anders	Hier wohnte Erna Anders Jg. 1923 eingewiesen 1939 Heilanstalt Langenhorn ‚verlegt‘ 25.11.1941 Heilanstalt Pfafferode ermordet 27.11.1941		
Im Tale 6; 53.595876°N 9.981701°E	Selma von Halle	Hier wohnte Selma von Halle Jg. 1881 gedemütigt/entrechtet Flucht in den Tod 8.3.1938		
Im Tale 13; 53.595769°N 9.981512°E	Bertha Hirsch	Hier wohnte Bertha Hirsch geb. Magnus Jg. 1872 deportiert 1942 Theresienstadt ermordet 12.2.1943		
Im Tale 27; 53.5957115°N 9.9796698°E	Robert Finnern	Hier wohnte Robert Finnern Jg. 1894 verhaftet 1938 ‚Hochverrat‘ Gefängnis HH-Fuhlsbüttel 1939 Oranienburg ermordet 22.4.1940		
Im Tale 37; 53.595681°N 9.978763°E	Arno Pump	Hier wohnte Arno Pump Jg. 1934 eingewiesen 1939 Alsterdorfer Anstalten ‚verlegt‘ 7.8.1943 Heilanstalt Eichberg ermordet 15.10.1943		
Isekai 5; 53.5855992°N 9.9900669°E	Paul Adler	Hier wohnte Paul Adler Jg. 1915 deportiert Auschwitz ???		Another Stolperstein for this person is in Wilmersdorf.
Isekai 5; 53.5855858°N 9.9900669°E	Felix Arnheim	Hier wohnte Dr. Felix Arnheim Jg. 1864 Berufsverbot 1939 Flucht Belgien entrechtet/gedemütigt tot 15.11.1941 Belgien		
Isekai 5; 53.5856116°N 9.9900667°E	Hedwig Slutzki (née Arnheim)	Hier wohnte Hedwig Slutzki geb. Arnheim Jg. 1894 Flucht/Frankreich deportiert 1943 Auschwitz ???		
Isekai 15; 53.585694°N 9.992333°E	Anna Blumenfeld	Hier wohnte Anna Blumenfeld Jg. 1875 gedemütigt/entrechtet Flucht in den Tod 24.10.1941		
Isekai 15; 53.585694°N 9.992333°E	Hans Berthold Heilbut	Hier wohnte Hans Berthold Heilbut Jg. 1903 Flucht 1938 Holland interniert Westerbork deportiert 1944 Theresienstadt ermordet 21.10.1944 Auschwitz		
Isekai 15; 53.585694°N 9.992333°E	Susanna B. Heilbut (née Rose)	Hier wohnte Susanna B. Heilbut geb. Rose Jg. 1910 Flucht 1938 Holland interniert Westerbork deportiert 1944 Theresienstadt ermordet 21.10.1944 Auschwitz		
Isekai 15; 53.585694°N 9.992333°E	Ursula Heilbut	Hier wohnte Ursula Heilbut Jg. 1935 Flucht 1938 Holland interniert Westerbork deportiert 1944 Theresienstadt ermordet 21.10.1944 Auschwitz		
Isekai 15; 53.585694°N 9.992333°E	Olga Kaufmann	Hier wohnte Olga Kaufmann Jg. 1874 gedemütigt/entrechtet Flucht in den Tod 24.10.1941		
Isekai 18; 53.5857062°N 9.9928751°E	Hugo Heimann	Hier wohnte Hugo Heimann Jg. 1868 deportiert 1942 Theresienstadt ermordet 28.5.1943		
Isekai 18; 53.5857236°N 9.9928707°E	Hertha Lindenberg (née Caro)	Hier wohnte Hertha Lindenberg geb. Caro Jg. 1901 deportiert 1942 Theresienstadt ermordet 1944 in Auschwitz		
Kegelhofstraße 13; 53.595145°N 9.982708°E	Walter Möller	Hier wohnte Walter Möller Jg. 1905 verhaftet 1932 ‚Altonaer Blutsonntag‘ verurteilt 2.6.1933 hingerichtet 1.8.1933 Gefängnis Altona		Another Stolperstein for this person is in Altona-Nord.
Kegelhofstraße 24; 53.5952319°N 9.9809763°E	Adolf Mahlmann	Hier wohnte Adolf Mahlmann Jg. 1876 im Widerstand/KPD verhaftet 11.12.1942 KZ Fuhlsbüttel KZ Sachsenhausen KZ Buchenwald ermordet 28.2.1945		
Kegelhofstraße 34; 53.5952022°N 9.9798549°E	Emil Bär	Hier wohnte Emil Bär Jg. 1877 deportiert 1941 Minsk ermordet		
Kegelhofstraße 34; 53.5952019°N 9.9798613°E	Rudolphine Bär	Hier wohnte Rudolphine Bär Jg. 1879 deportiert 1941 Minsk ermordet		
Kegelhofstraße 47; 53.595068°N 9.979041°E	Bodo Löwenthal	Hier wohnte Bodo Löwenthal Jg. 1911 deportiert 1941 Riga ermordet 26.3.1942		
Kegelhofstraße 47; 53.595068°N 9.979041°E	Marie Löwenthal (née Massarik)	Hier wohnte Marie Löwenthal geb. Massarik Jg. 1909 deportiert 1941 Riga ermordet 1942		
Kegelhofstraße 47; 53.595068°N 9.979041°E	Anna Massarik (née Hirschfeld)	Hier wohnte Anna Massarik geb. Hirschfeld Jg. 1885 deportiert 1942 Theresienstadt 1943 Auschwitz ermordet		
Kellinghusenstraße 11; 53.590356°N 9.991785°E	Gertrud Pardo	Hier lehrte Gertrud Pardo Jg. 1883 deportiert 1941 Łodz ermordet		
Kunhardtstraße 6; 53.5908717°N 9.9939751°E	Ella Grünewald (née Wolff)	Hier wohnte Ella Grünewald geb. Wolff Jg. 1898 deportiert 1941 Ghetto Minsk ermordet		Another Stolperstein for this person is in Harvestehude.
Kunhardtstraße 6; 53.5908717°N 9.9939751°E	Ludwig Eugen Grünewald	Hier wohnte Ludwig Eugen Grünewald Jg. 1893 ‚Schutzhaft‘ 1938 KZ Sachsenhausen deportiert 1941 Ghetto Minsk ermordet		
Lenhartzstraße 1; 53.5855355°N 9.9815435°E	Otto Meyer	Hier wohnte Dr. Otto Meyer Jg. 1898 deportiert 1941 Łodz ???		
Lenhartzstraße 3; 53.585675°N 9.981647°E	Ina Behrmann (née Hoffmann)	Hier wohnte Ina Behrmann geb. Hoffmann Jg. 1882 deportiert 1941 Łodz ermordet		
Lenhartzstraße 3; 53.585675°N 9.981647°E	Hermine Hofmann (née Roos)	Hier wohnte Hermine Hofmann geb. Roos Jg. 1880 deportiert 1942 Theresienstadt 1944 Auschwitz ermordet		
Lenhartzstraße 3; 53.585675°N 9.981647°E	Siegmund Hofmann	Hier wohnte Siegmund Hofmann Jg. 1875 deportiert 1942 Theresienstadt 1944 Auschwitz ermordet		
Lenhartzstraße 3; 53.585675°N 9.981647°E	Wolf Jägermann	Hier wohnte Wolf Jägermann Jg. 1896 eingewiesen 1941 ‚Heilanstalt‘ Langenhorn verlegt 1943 Hadamar ermordet 4.10.1943		
Lenhartzstraße 3; 53.585675°N 9.981647°E	Carl Löwenberg	Hier wohnte Carl Löwenberg Jg. 1869 deportiert 1942 Theresienstadt 1942 Treblinka ermordet		
Lenhartzstraße 3; 53.585675°N 9.981647°E	Selma Meyer (née Goldstein)	Hier wohnte Selma Meyer geb. Goldstein Jg. 1885 deportiert 1941 Riga ermordet		
Lenhartzstraße 3; 53.585675°N 9.981647°E	Elka Naphtalie (née Haber)	Hier wohnte Elka Naphtalie geb. Haber Jg. 1892 deportiert 1941 Riga 1944 Stutthof ???		
Lenhartzstraße 3; 53.585675°N 9.981647°E	Gerda Pulka (née Naphtalie)	Hier wohnte Gerda Pulka geb. Naphtalie Jg. 1921 deportiert 1941 Łodz ???		Another Stolperstein for this person is in Altona-Altstadt.
Lenhartzstraße 3; 53.585675°N 9.981647°E	Marie Sievers (née Aronheim)	Hier wohnte Marie Sievers geb. Aronheim Jg. 1876 deportiert 1942 Theresienstadt ermordet 29.1.1943		
Lenhartzstraße 3; 53.585675°N 9.981647°E	Elise Wilda	Hier wohnte Elise Wilda Jg. 1859 1942 KZ Fuhlsbüttel deportiert 1942 ermordet 13.2.1943 Theresienstadt		Another Stolperstein for this person is in Hamm.
Lenhartzstraße 3; 53.585675°N 9.981647°E	Emma Wilda	Hier wohnte Emma Wilda Jg. 1872 1942 KZ Fuhlsbüttel deportiert 1942 ermordet 13.2.1943 Theresienstadt		Another Stolperstein for this person is in Hamm.
Lenhartzstraße 3; 53.585675°N 9.981647°E	Ernst Wilda	Hier wohnte Ernst Wilda Jg. 1863 1942 KZ Fuhlsbüttel deportiert 1942 ermordet 6.8.1942 Theresienstadt		Another Stolperstein for this person is in Hamm.
Lenhartzstraße 3; 53.585675°N 9.981647°E	Therese Wilda	Hier wohnte Therese Wilda Jg. 1870 1942 KZ Fuhlsbüttel deportiert 1942 ermordet 27.1.1943 Theresienstadt		Further Stolpersteine for this person are in Hamm and Rothenburgsort.
Lenhartzstraße 5; 53.5858244°N 9.9817184°E	Margot Alice Wolf (née Salomon)	Hier wohnte Margot Alice Wolff geb. Salomon Jg. 1893 entrechtet/gedemütigt Flucht in den Tod Juli 1942		The stone reads Wolff.
Lenhartzstraße 6; 53.5862714°N 9.9821846°E	Eduard Guckenheimer	Hier wohnte Eduard Guckenheimer Jg. 1893 ‚Schutzhaft‘ 1938 Sachsenhausen Flucht 1939 Argentinien		
Lenhartzstraße 7; 53.5860063°N 9.9817502°E	Bernhard Aronsohn	Hier wohnte Dr. Bernhard Aronsohn Jg. 1874 deportiert 1942 Auschwitz ermordet		Another Stolperstein for this person is in Lübtheen.
Lenhartzstraße 7; 53.5860099°N 9.9817508°E	Ida Aronsohn (née Ostberg)	Hier wohnte Ida Aronsohn geb. Ostberg Jg. 1888 deportiert 1942 Auschwitz ermordet		
Lenhartzstraße 7; 53.5860184°N 9.9817470°E	Henriette Hirsch (née Heymann)	Hier wohnte Henriette Hirsch geb. Heymann Jg. 1872 deportiert 1942 Theresienstadt ermordet 19.9.1942		
Lenhartzstraße 7; 53.5860149°N 9.9817507°E	Manfred Horowitz	Hier wohnte Dr. Manfred Horowitz Jg. 1880 gedemütigt/entrechtet Flucht in den Tod 14.11.1937		Another Stolperstein for this person is in Neustadt.
Lenhartzstraße 10; 53.5867226°N 9.9822176°E	Anna Eva Sussmann (née Bernheim)	Hier wohnte Anna Eva Sussmann geb. Bernheim Jg. 1863 gedemütigt/entrechtet Flucht in den Tod 2.4.1942		
Lenhartzstraße 10; 53.5867138°N 9.9822153°E	Franz Martin Sussmann	Hier wohnte Franz Martin Sussmann Jg. 1904 deportiert 1941 ermordet in Minsk		
Lenhartzstraße 13; 53.586564°N 9.981817°E	Hannelore Marie Cohn	Hier wohnte Hannelore Marie Cohn Jg. 1933 Flucht 1939 Palästina		
Lenhartzstraße 13; 53.586564°N 9.981817°E	Hedda Cohn (née Wiener)	Hier wohnte Hedda Cohn geb. Wiener Jg. 1909 Flucht 1939 Palästina		
Lenhartzstraße 13; 53.586564°N 9.981817°E	Peter Cohn	Hier wohnte Peter Cohn Jg. 1938 Flucht 1939 Palästina		
Lenhartzstraße 13; 53.586564°N 9.981817°E	Walter Cohn	Hier wohnte Walter Cohn Jg. 1905 Flucht 1939 Palästina		
Lenhartzstraße 13; 53.586564°N 9.981817°E	Laura Coutinho	Hier wohnte Laura Coutinho Jg. 1868 deportiert 1942 Theresienstadt ermordet 9.12.1942		
Lenhartzstraße 13; 53.586564°N 9.981817°E	Therese Thekla Rosenberg (née Melling)	Hier wohnte Therese Thekla Rosenberg geb. Melling Jg. 1857 deportiert 1942 Theresienstadt ermordet 23.7.1942		
Lenhartzstraße 15; 53.5868364°N 9.9819064°E	Käthe Eschwege (née Naphtaly)	Hier wohnte Käthe Eschwege geb. Naphtaly Jg. 1871 deportiert 1942 Theresienstadt ermordet 28.12.1942		
Lenhartzstraße 15; 53.5868466°N 9.9819070°E	Mary Hammerschmidt (née Leopold)	Hier wohnte Mary Hammerschmidt geb. Leopold Jg. 1877 deportiert Majdanek ermordet		
Lenhartzstraße 25; 53.588774°N 9.982460°E	Peter Lass	Hier wohnte Peter Lass Jg. 1899 im Widerstand/KPD verhaftet 4.10.1934 ‚Vorbereitung Hochverrat‘ KZ Fuhlsbüttel entlassen 1937 1944 Strafbataillon 999 überlebt		
Lenhartzstraße 31; 53.589193°N 9.982545°E	Elsbeth Platz	Hier wohnte Elsbeth Platz Jg. 1884 deportiert 1941 Riga ermordet		
Loehrsweg 2; 53.5860323°N 9.9870057°E	Felicitas Gumpel	Hier wohnte Felicitas Gumpel Jg. 1929 Flucht 1937 Belgien deportiert 1942 Auschwitz ermordet		
Loehrsweg 2; 53.5860419°N 9.9870061°E	Gertrud Gumpel (née Koppel)	Hier wohnte Gertrud Gumpel geb. Koppel Jg. 1898 Flucht 1937 Belgien deportiert 1942 Auschwitz ermordet		
Loehrsweg 2; 53.5860371°N 9.9870059°E	Kurt Gumpel	Hier wohnte Kurt Gumpel Jg. 1924 Flucht 1937 Belgien deportiert 1942 Auschwitz ermordet		
Loehrsweg 2; 53.5860276°N 9.9870054°E	Thomas Gumpel	Hier wohnte Thomas Gumpel Jg. 1931 Flucht 1937 Belgien deportiert 1942 Auschwitz ermordet		
Loehrsweg 11; 53.5875813°N 9.9886001°E	Henry Fränkel	Hier wohnte Henry Fränkel Jg. 1886 Flucht 1939 Shanghai interniert Ghetto Shanghai befreit		
Loehrsweg 12; 53.5877219°N 9.9887538°E	José Danon	Hier wohnte José Danon Jg. 1897 Flucht Frankreich interniert Drancy deportiert 1944 Kowno ermordet		
Loogestieg 3; 53.5871461°N 9.9854875°E	Martha Frankenstein (née Worms)	Hier wohnte Martha Frankenstein geb. Worms Jg. 1874 deportiert 1941 Łodz ermordet		
Loogestieg 3; 53.5871461°N 9.9854875°E	Martin Frankenstein	Hier wohnte Martin Frankenstein Jg. 1872 gedemütigt/entrechtet Flucht in den Tod 19.7.1939		
Loogestieg 3; 53.5871747°N 9.9854879°E	Gertrud Katz (née Worms)	Hier wohnte Gertrud Katz geb. Worms Jg. 1884 deportiert 1941 Łodz ermordet		
Loogestieg 3; 53.5871890°N 9.9854881°E	Hermann Katz	Hier wohnte Hermann Katz Jg. 1881 deportiert 1941 Łodz ermordet		
Loogestieg 3; 53.5871604°N 9.9854877°E	Hildegard Katz	Hier wohnte Hildegard Katz Jg. 1917 deportiert 1941 ermordet		
Loogestieg 4; 53.5870840°N 9.9853543°E	Elli Adele Hymans (née Dinkelspiel)	Hier wohnte Elli Adele Hymans geb. Dinkelspiel Jg. 1905 deportiert 1941 Minsk ermordet		
Loogestieg 4; 53.5870658°N 9.9853612°E	Leonhardt Hymans	Hier wohnte Leonhardt Hymans Jg. 1898 deportiert 1941 Minsk ermordet		
Loogestieg 4; 53.5870658°N 9.9853612°E	Franziska Lewek	Hier wohnte Franziska Lewek Jg. 1873 deportiert 1942 Theresienstadt 1942 Treblinka ermordet		
Loogestieg 6; 53.586982°N 9.985737°E	Edgar Kohn	Hier wohnte Edgar Kohn Jg. 1923 Flucht 1939 Belgien interniert Mechelen deportiert 1943 ermordet in Auschwitz		
Loogestieg 6; 53.586982°N 9.985737°E	Johanna Kohn (née Feimann)	Hier wohnte Johanna Kohn geb. Feimann Jg. 1885 Flucht 1939 Belgien interniert Mechelen deportiert 1943 ermordet in Auschwitz		
Loogestieg 7; 53.587113°N 9.985765°E	Johanna Kuhn (née Wolff)	Hier wohnte Johanna Kuhn geb. Wolff Jg. 1871 deportiert 1941 ermordet in Riga		
Loogestieg 7; 53.587113°N 9.985765°E	Berta Salomon (née Peine)	Hier wohnte Berta Salomon geb. Peine Jg. 1872 deportiert 1942 Theresienstadt 1942 Treblinka ermordet		
Loogestieg 8; 53.586776°N 9.986225°E	Johanna Baruch	Hier wohnte Johanna Baruch Jg. 1861 deportiert 1943 Theresienstadt ermordet 19.4.1943		
Loogestieg 10; 53.5866397°N 9.9865330°E	Edwin Horowitz	Hier wohnte Edwin Horowitz Jg. 1881 Selbstmord 14.9.1939		
Loogestieg 10; 53.5866538°N 9.9865297°E	Anna Mendel (née Arnheim)	Hier wohnte Anna Mendel geb. Arnheim Jg. 1876 deportiert 1942 Theresienstadt ermordet 4.1.1944		
Loogestieg 10; 53.5866730°N 9.9865287°E	Paul Michael Mendel	Hier wohnte Paul Michael Mendel Jg. 1873 deportiert 1942 Theresienstadt ermordet 21.11.1942		
Loogestieg 11; 53.587008°N 9.985947°E	Margarethe Marum (née Frank)	Hier wohnte Margarethe Marum geb. Frank Jg. 1877 deportiert 1941 Riga-Jungfernhof ermordet		
Loogestieg 11; 53.587008°N 9.985947°E	Melanie Rosenberg (née Strauss)	Hier wohnte Melanie Rosenberg geb. Strauss Jg. 1869 deportiert 1942 Theresienstadt ermordet 14.10.1942		
Loogestieg 12; 53.5865524°N 9.9868355°E	Alice Vorwahlner (née Deutsch)	Hier wohnte Alice Vorwahlner geb. Deutsch Jg. 1888 deportiert 1942 Theresienstadt ermordet am 15.8.1943		
Loogestieg 13; 53.5869175°N 9.9861951°E	Alice Berju (née Goldenberg)	Hier wohnte Alice Berju geb. Goldenberg Jg. 1895 eingewiesen 1929 Heilanstalt Langenhorn ‚verlegt‘ 23.9.1940 Brandenburg ermordet 23.9.1940 ‚Aktion T4‘		
Loogestieg 13; 53.5869175°N 9.9861951°E	Iwan Hess	Hier wohnte Iwan Hess Jg. 1870 Flucht Holland deportiert 1943 Sobibor ermordet		
Loogestieg 13; 53.5869018°N 9.9861917°E	Ilo Levy	Hier wohnte Ilo Levy Jg. 1882 deportiert 1941 Łodz ermordet		
Loogestieg 15; 53.5868236°N 9.9865376°E	Lisbeth Engelmann (née Reyersbach)	Hier wohnte Lisbeth Engelmann geb. Reyersbach Jg. 1882 deportiert 1941 Łodz/Litzmannstadt ermordet 9.2.1942		
Loogestieg 17; 53.5867250°N 9.9866656°E	Gertrud Breslauer (née Goldschmidt)	Hier wohnte Gertrud Breslauer geb. Goldschmidt Jg. 1890 deportiert 1941 Riga ???		
Loogestieg 17; 53.5867430°N 9.9866656°E	Fritz Kahn	Hier wohnte Fritz Kahn Jg. 1893 deportiert 1941 Łodz ermordet am 16.11.1942		
Loogestieg 17; 53.5867340°N 9.9866656°E	Rosa Kahn (née Buxbaum)	Hier wohnte Rosa Kahn geb. Buxbaum Jg. 1903 deportiert 1941 Łodz ermordet		
Loogestieg 19; 53.586653°N 9.986992°E	Emil Heller	Hier wohnte Emil Heller Jg. 1883 deportiert 1942 Auschwitz ermordet		
Loogestieg 19; 53.586653°N 9.986992°E	Paula Heller (née Lennhoff)	Hier wohnte Paula Heller geb. Lennhoff Jg. 1886 deportiert 1942 Auschwitz ermordet		
Loogestieg 19; 53.586653°N 9.986992°E	Rosa Scheuer	Hier wohnte Rosa Scheuer Jg. 1876 deportiert 1941 Łodz ermordet		
Ludolfstraße 44; 53.592715°N 9.991594°E	Herbert Burmeister	Hier wohnte Herbert Burmeister Jg. 1916 desertiert 11.12.1942 verhaftet 28.12.1942 Gefängnis Holstenglacis verurteilt 3.8.1944 hingerichtet 11.9.1944 Holstenglacis		
Ludolfstraße 44; 53.592715°N 9.991594°E	Heinrich Pütz	Hier wohnte Heinrich Pütz Jg. 1857 Flucht 1939 Holland interniert Westerbork deportiert 1943 Sobibor ermordet 23.7.1943		
Martinistraße 52; 53.589924°N 9.975331°E	–	Hier forschten und lehrten gedemütigt/entrechtet 1933 Lehrverbot aus ‚rassischen‘ Gründen		Header stone at the University Medical Center Hamburg-Eppendorf
Martinistraße 52; 53.589924°N 9.975331°E	Ernst Delbanco	Dr. Ernst Delbanco Jg. 1869 Flucht in den Tod 31.3.1935		Further Stolpersteine for this person are in Rotherbaum and Winterhude.
Martinistraße 52; 53.589924°N 9.975331°E	Walter Griesbach	Dr. Walter Griesbach Jg. 1888 Flucht 1938 Neuseeland überlebt		Another Stolperstein for this person is in Rotherbaum.
Martinistraße 52; 53.589924°N 9.975331°E	Arthur Haim	Dr. Arthur Haim Jg. 1888 Flucht 1934 USA überlebt		
Martinistraße 52; 53.589924°N 9.975331°E	Erwin Jacobsthal	Dr. Erwin Jacobsthal Jg. 1879 Flucht 1934 Guatemala überlebt		
Martinistraße 52; 53.589924°N 9.975331°E	Hermann Josephy	Hier arbeitete Dr. Hermann Josephy Jg. 1887 ‚Schutzhaft‘ 1938 Sachsenhausen Flucht 1939 England 1940 USA		Replaced in March 2023 (previous stone)
Martinistraße 52; 53.589924°N 9.975331°E	Victor Kafka	Dr. Victor Kafka Jg. 1881 ‚Schutzhaft‘ 1935 KZ Fuhlsbüttel Flucht 1939 Norwegen 1942 Schweden überlebt		
Martinistraße 52; 53.589924°N 9.975331°E	Otto Kestner	Dr. Otto Kestner Jg. 1873 Flucht 1935 England überlebt		
Martinistraße 52; 53.589924°N 9.975331°E	Paul Kimmelstiel	Dr. Paul Kimmelstiel Jg. 1900 Flucht 1934 USA überlebt		
Martinistraße 52; 53.589924°N 9.975331°E	Walter Kirschbaum	Dr. Walter Kirschbaum Jg. 1894 ‚Schutzhaft‘ 1938 Sachsenhausen Flucht 1939 USA überlebt		
Martinistraße 52; 53.589924°N 9.975331°E	Rahel Liebeschütz-Plaut	Dr. Rahel Liebeschütz-Plaut Jg. 1894 Flucht 1938 England überlebt		Another Stolperstein for this person is in Rotherbaum.
Martinistraße 52; 53.589924°N 9.975331°E	Martin Mayer	Dr. Martin Mayer Jg. 1875 Flucht 1939 Venezuela überlebt		
Martinistraße 52; 53.589924°N 9.975331°E	Ernst-Friedrich Müller	Dr. Ernst-Friedrich Müller Jg. 1891 Flucht 1934 USA überlebt		
Martinistraße 52; 53.589924°N 9.975331°E	Heinrich Poll	Dr. Heinrich Poll Jg. 1877 Flucht 1939 Schweden tot 12.6.1939		Another Stolperstein for this person is in Rotherbaum.
Martinistraße 52; 53.589924°N 9.975331°E	Ernst Sieburg	Dr. Ernst Sieburg Jg. 1885 Verzicht 1933 auf Lehrbefugnis tot 16.1.1937		
Martinistraße 52; 53.589924°N 9.975331°E	Hans Türkheim	Dr. Hans Türkheim Jg. 1889 Flucht 1936 England überlebt		
Martinistraße 52; 53.589924°N 9.975331°E	Friedrich Wohlwill	Dr. Friedrich Wohlwill Jg. 1881 Flucht 1933 Portugal überlebt		
Martinistraße 52; 53.589924°N 9.975331°E	–	Für die Namenlosen gedemütigt/entrechtet Lehrverbot/entlassen aus ‚rassischen‘ Gründen		Additional stone at the University Medical Center Hamburg-Eppendorf
Rainweg 9; 53.586123°N 9.991212°E	Angela Pardo	Hier wohnte Angela Pardo Jg. 1885 deportiert 1941 Łodz ermordet		
Rainweg 9; 53.586123°N 9.991212°E	Gertrud Pardo	Hier wohnte Gertrud Pardo Jg. 1883 deportiert 1941 Łodz ermordet		
Schedestraße 13; 53.59375°N 9.9801°E	Hermann Boje	Hier wohnte Hermann Boje Jg. 1891 eingewiesen 1939 Alsterdorfer Anstalten Heilanstalt Eichberg ‚verlegt‘ 12.10.1943 Heilanstalt Hadamar ermordet 29.10.1943		
Schedestraße 13; 53.59375°N 9.9801°E	Melitta Handorf	Hier wohnte Melitta Handorf Jg. 1911 eingewiesen 1943 Alsterdorfer Anstalten ‚verlegt‘ 16.8.1943 Am Steinhof Wien ermordet 7.3.1944		
Schedestraße 18; 53.593691°N 9.982894°E	Erich Siegbert Redlich	Hier wohnte Erich Siegbert Redlich Jg. 1887 deportiert 1941 Łodz ermordet 22.2.1942		
Schedestraße 37; 53.593782°N 9.982424°E	Markus Friedländer	Hier wohnte Markus Friedländer Jg. 1866 deportiert 1942 Theresienstadt ermordet 14.3.1943		
Schedestraße 39; 53.593789°N 9.982624°E	Helene Bloch	Hier wohnte Helene Bloch Jg. 1872 deportiert 1942 Theresienstadt ermordet in Treblinka		
Schedestraße 39; 53.593789°N 9.982624°E	Henriette Bloch	Hier wohnte Henriette Bloch Jg. 1864 deportiert 1942 Theresienstadt ermordet in Treblinka		
Schrammsweg 6; 53.5907978°N 9.9883444°E	Hedwig Oppenheim (née Wallach)	Hier wohnte Hedwig Oppenheim geb. Wallach Jg. 1895 deportiert 1942 Theresienstadt 1944 Auschwitz ermordet		
Schrammsweg 6; 53.5908096°N 9.9883478°E	Rudolph Oppenheim	Hier wohnte Rudolph Oppenheim Jg. 1885 deportiert 1942 Theresienstadt 1944 Auschwitz ermordet		
Schrammsweg 8; 53.590812°N 9.988625°E	Karl-Heinz Cordes	Hier wohnte Karl-Heinz Cordes Jg. 1934 eingewiesen 1940 Alsterdorfer Anstalten ‚verlegt‘ 1943 Heilanstalt Mainkofen ermordet 5.2.1945		
Schrammsweg 10; 53.5908153°N 9.9888346°E	Alfred Lion	Hier wohnte Alfred Lion Jg. 1884 deportiert 1941 Minsk ermordet		
Schrammsweg 10; 53.5908153°N 9.9888346°E	Lotte Rebecka Lion (née Strelitz)	Hier wohnte Lotte Rebecka Lion geb. Strelitz Jg. 1908 deportiert 1941 Ghetto Minsk ermordet		Another Stolperstein for this person is in Harvestehude.
Schrammsweg 25; 53.5908748°N 9.9904266°E	Albert Köpcke	Hier wohnte Albert Köpcke Jg. 1903 eingewiesen 1935 Alsterdorfer Anstalten ‚verlegt‘ 10.8.1943 Heilanstalt Mainkofen tot an den Folgen der Behandlung 11.7.1945		
Schrammsweg 27; 53.590860°N 9.990737°E	Antonie Siering (née Frank)	Hier wohnte Antonie Siering geb. Frank Jg. 1902 im Widerstand/SPD Flucht 1938 Dänemark		
Schrammsweg 27; 53.590860°N 9.990737°E	Lieselotte Siering	Hier wohnte Lieselotte Siering Jg. 1929 Flucht 1938 Dänemark		
Schrammsweg 27; 53.590860°N 9.990737°E	Walter Siering	Hier wohnte Walter Siering Jg. 1905 im Widerstand/SPD Flucht 1938 Dänemark		
Schrammsweg 29; 53.5908371°N 9.9909680°E	Annemarie Deutschländer	Hier wohnte Annemarie Deutschländer Jg. 1920 deportiert 1941 Minsk ???		
Schrammsweg 29; 53.5908376°N 9.9909541°E	Arnold Deutschländer	Hier wohnte Arnold Deutschländer Jg. 1882 deportiert 1941 Minsk ???		
Schrammsweg 29; 53.5908374°N 9.9909611°E	Dora Deutschländer (née Tietz)	Hier wohnte Dora Deutschländer geb. Tietz Jg. 1884 deportiert 1941 Minsk ???		
Schrammsweg 29; 53.5908317°N 9.9909598°E	Elfriede Rosenstein (née Sondermann)	Hier wohnte Elfriede Rosenstein geb. Sondermann Jg. 1896 deportiert 1941 Łodz ???		
Schrammsweg 29; 53.5908319°N 9.9909533°E	Iwan Rosenstein	Hier wohnte Iwan Rosenstein Jg. 1894 deportiert 1941 Łodz tot nach Selbstmordversuch		
Siemssenstraße 10; 53.597549°N 9.985181°E	Melvin Löw	Hier wohnte Melvin Löw Jg. 1874 gedemütigt/entrechtet Flucht in den Tod 27.3.1942		
Sudeckstraße 4; 53.5879668°N 9.9800038°E	Hedwig Maude Heckscher (née Koenigsberg)	Hier wohnte Hedwig Maude Heckscher geb. Koenigsberg Jg. 1885 verhaftet 1942 KZ Fuhlsbüttel deportiert 1943 Theresienstadt 1944 Auschwitz ermordet		
Sudeckstraße 4; 53.5879718°N 9.9799946°E	Philipp Heckscher	Hier wohnte Philipp Heckscher Jg. 1877 verhaftet 1942 KZ Fuhlsbüttel deportiert 1943 Theresienstadt ermordet 19.3.1943		
Tarpenbekstraße 66; 53.5950610°N 9.9841373°E	Walter Krützfeldt	Walter Krützfeldt Jg. 1903 im Widerstand/KPD verhaftet 19.12.1933 Zuchthaus Fuhlsbüttel 1943 Strafbataillon 999 Flucht 1945 Bosnien		
Tarpenbekstraße 66; 53.5950610°N 9.9841373°E	Ernst Thälmann	Hier wohnte Ernst Thälmann Jg. 1886 verhaftet 1933 Zuchthaus Berlin-Moabit 1937 Gefängnis Hannover 1943 Zuchthaus Bautzen 1944 Buchenwald ermordet 18.8.1944		Further Stolpersteine for this person are in Altstadt and Singen (Hohentwiel).
Tarpenbekstraße 107; 53.5981297°N 9.9837678°E	Günther Blobel	Hier wohnte Günther Blobel Jg. 1936 eingewiesen 1942 Alsterdorfer Anstalten ‚verlegt‘ 10.8.1943 Heilanstalt Mainkofen tot 28. Juni 1945		
Tarpenbekstraße 107; 53.5981297°N 9.9837678°E	Josephine Boock (née Jürgensen)	Hier wohnte Josephine Boock geb. Jürgensen Jg. 1857 eingewiesen 1941 Heilanstalt Langenhorn ‚verlegt‘ 2.11.1943 Meseritz-Obrawalde ermordet 8.11.1943		
Tarpenbekstraße 107; 53.5981297°N 9.9837678°E	Klaus Peter Wörbach	Hier wohnte Klaus Peter Wörbach Jg. 1938 eingewiesen 1942 Alsterdorfer Anstalten ‚verlegt‘ 7.8.1943 Heilanstalt Kalmenhof/Idstein ermordet 7.9.1943		
Woldsenweg 5; 53.5879321°N 9.9867068°E	Walter Davidsohn	Hier wohnte Walter Davidsohn Jg. 1895 deportiert 1942 Theresienstadt 1943 Auschwitz ermordet		
Woldsenweg 5; 53.5879299°N 9.9867123°E	Ella Davidsohn (née Hildesheim)	Hier wohnte Ella Davidsohn geb. Hildesheim Jg. 1872 deportiert 1942 Theresienstadt ermordet 9.3.1943		
Woldsenweg 5; 53.5879366°N 9.9867120°E	Alberto Jonas	Hier wohnte Dr. Alberto Jonas Jg. 1889 deportiert 1942 Theresienstadt ermordet am 29.8.1942		Another Stolperstein for this person is in Rotherbaum.
Woldsenweg 5; 53.5879345°N 9.9867177°E	Marie Anna Jonas (née Levinsohn)	Hier wohnte Dr. Marie Anna Jonas geb. Levinsohn Jg. 1893 deportiert 1942 Theresienstadt 1944 Auschwitz ermordet		
Woldsenweg 5; 53.5879407°N 9.9867006°E	Bernard Moser	Hier wohnte Berhard Moser Jg. 1882 deportiert 1941 Łodz ermordet am 8.7.1942		
Woldsenweg 5; 53.5879387°N 9.9867063°E	Marie Therese Moser (née Strohmberg)	Hier wohnte Marie Therese Moser geb. Strohmberg Jg. 1884 deportiert 1941 Łodz weiterdeportiert ermordet		
Woldsenweg 5; 53.5879342°N 9.9867014°E	Cloe Neuburger (née Rosenfeld)	Hier wohnte Cloe Neuburger geb. Rosenfeld Jg. 1885 deportiert 1941 Łodz weiterdeportiert ermordet		
Woldsenweg 5; 53.5879363°N 9.9866960°E	Fritz Neuburger	Hier wohnte Fritz Neuburger Jg. 1876 1938 KZ Fuhlsbüttel deportiert 1941 Łodz weiterdeportiert ermordet		
Woldsenweg 5; 53.5879324°N 9.9867234°E	Ruth Neuhaus	Hier wohnte Ruth Neuhaus Jg. 1918 deportiert 1941 Łodz weiterdeportiert 1944 ???		
Woldsenweg 5; 53.5879278°N 9.9867177°E	Georg Peters	Hier wohnte Georg Peters Jg. 1872 inhaftiert 1936–1938 eingewiesen ‚Landesheilanstalt‘ Weilmünster ermordet 6.4.1944		
Woldsenweg 6; 53.587836°N 9.986561°E	Elfriede Griesbach (née Bender)	Hier wohnte Elfriede Griesbach geb. Bender Jg. 1900 Flucht 1933 Holland interniert 1944 Westerbork deportiert Auschwitz ermordet 31.8.1944		
Woldsenweg 6; 53.587836°N 9.986561°E	Richard Max Griesbach	Hier wohnte Richard Max Griesbach Jg. 1892 Flucht 1933 Holland interniert 1944 Westerbork deportiert Auschwitz ermordet 8.4.1944		
Woldsenweg 6; 53.587836°N 9.986561°E	Arthur Hauptmann	Hier wohnte Arthur Hauptmann Jg. 1869 deportiert 1942 Theresienstadt 1942 Treblinka ermordet		
Woldsenweg 6; 53.587836°N 9.986561°E	Selma Hauptmann (née Baumgarten)	Hier wohnte Selma Hauptmann geb. Baumgarten Jg. 1868 deportiert 1942 Theresienstadt 1942 Treblinka ermordet		
Woldsenweg 7; 53.5878253°N 9.9869831°E	Otto Luria	Hier wohnte Otto Luria Jg. 1869 verhaftet 1938 KZ Fuhlsbüttel eingewiesen Heilanstalt Langenhorn tot an Folgen 31.8.1939		
Woldsenweg 8; 53.5877610°N 9.9867539°E	Kurt Georg Mehrgut	Hier wohnte Kurt Georg Mehrgut Jg. 1914 inhaftiert 1934–1936 Gefängnis Hamburg Flucht 1936 Prag Flucht 1937 Holland deportiert 1941 Mauthausen ermordet 10.9.1941		Another Stolperstein for this person is in Winterhude.
Woldsenweg 8; 53.5877550°N 9.9867536°E	Sophie Mehrgut	Hier wohnte Sophie Mehrgut Jg. 1880 deportiert 1941 Łodz ermordet 12.5.1942		
Woldsenweg 8; 53.5877657°N 9.9867541°E	Wolf Willy Mehrgut	Hier wohnte Wolf Willy Mehrgut Jg. 1883 Flucht 1937 Holland deportiert 1944 Bergen-Belsen ermordet 25.2.1945		
Woldsenweg 9; 53.5877636°N 9.9871703°E	Alice Feldmann	Hier wohnte Alice Feldmann Jg. 1897 deportiert 1941 Łodz ermordet 1942 in Chelmno		
Woldsenweg 9; 53.5877668°N 9.9871581°E	Paula Feldmann (née Schüler)	Hier wohnte Paula Feldmann geb. Schüler Jg. 1874 deportiert 1942 Theresienstadt ermordet 11.12.1942		
Woldsenweg 9; 53.5877488°N 9.9871788°E	Aurelie Levison (née Roos)	Hier wohnte Aurelie Levinson geb. Ross Jg. 1879 deportiert 1941 Riga ermordet		The stone reads Levinson, née Ross.
Woldsenweg 9; 53.5877488°N 9.9871788°E	Elisabeth Wulff	Hier wohnte Elisabeth Wulff geb. Schönfeld Jg. 1867 Flucht 1939 England		
Woldsenweg 13; 53.5875156°N 9.9877577°E	Juliane Appel	Hier wohnte Juliane Appel Jg. 1889 deportiert 1941 Łodz/Litzmannstadt ermordet 20.4.1942 Chelmno/Kulmhof		
Woldsenweg 13; 53.5875156°N 9.9877577°E	Henriette Cohen (née Behrens)	Hier wohnte Henriette Cohens geb. Behrens Jg. 1885 deportiert 1942 weiter deportiert ermordet		The stone reads Cohens.
Woldsenweg 13; 53.5875139°N 9.9877621°E	Siegmund Goldschmidt	Hier wohnte Siegmund Goldschmidt Jahrg. 1887 deportiert 1941 Łodz ermordet		
Woldsenweg 13; 53.5875182°N 9.9877537°E	Mathilde Laski (née Kallmess)	Hier wohnte Mathilde Laski geb. Kallmess Jg. 1888 deportiert 1941 Łodz ermordet am 12.7.1942		
Woldsenweg 16; 53.587373°N 9.987768°E	Marion Werner	Hier wohnte Marion Werner; Jg. 1923 deportiert 1941 Łodz weiterdeportiert ermordet		Another Stolperstein for this person is in Harvestehude.
Woldsenweg 16; 53.587373°N 9.987768°E	Olga Werner (née Seligmann)	Hier wohnte Olga Werner geb. Seligmann; Jg. 1887 deportiert 1941 Łodz weiterdeportiert ermordet		
Woldsenweg 16; 53.587373°N 9.987768°E	Victor Werner	Hier wohnte Victor Werner; Jg. 1880 deportiert 1941 Łodz weiterdeportiert ermordet		

== See also ==
- List of Stolpersteine in Hanover
