= Primorsk, Kaliningrad Oblast =

Town in Kaliningrad Oblast, Russia

Primorsk Приморск
- Town
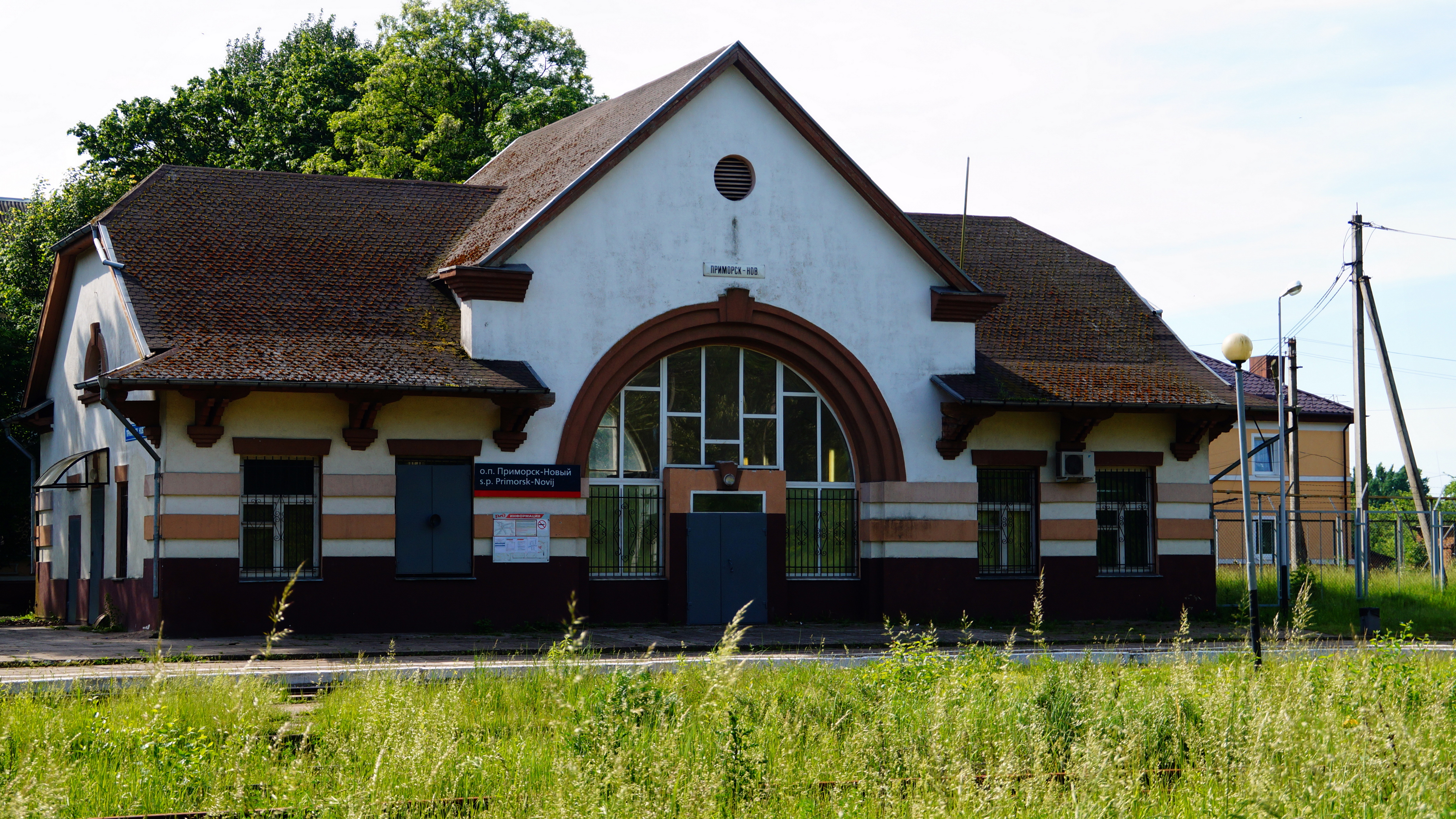
- Train station

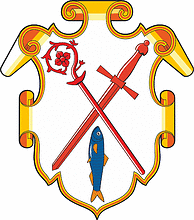
- Coat of arms
- Interactive map of Primorsk
- Location of Primorsk Primorsk (European Russia) Primorsk (Europe)
- Coordinates: 54°44′N 20°01′E
- Country: Russia
- Federal subject: Kaliningrad Oblast
- Administrative district: Baltiysky District
- Town of district significanceSelsoviet: Primorsk
- First mentioned: 1268
- Town status since: 2008
- Elevation: 10 m (33 ft)

Population (2010 Census)
  - Total: 1,956
  - Estimate (2023): 1,447 (−26%)

Administrative status
  - Capital of: town of district significance of Primorsk

Municipal status
  - Municipal district: Baltiysky Municipal District
  - Urban settlement: Primorskoye Urban Settlement
  - Capital of: Primorskoye Urban Settlement
- Time zone: UTC+2 (MSK–1)
- Postal code: 238510
- OKTMO ID: 27605102051

Primorsk (Russian: Примо́рск; German: Fischhausen; Polish: Rybaki; Lithuanian: Žuvininkai/Skanavikas) is a town in Baltiysky District of Kaliningrad Oblast, Russia, located on the Vistula Lagoon.

Its population is 1,956 (2010 census); compared to 2,150 (2002 census); 1,792 (1989 Soviet census)..

== Geography ==
The town is located in the southwest of the Sambia Peninsula. It is situated by a bay on the northern shore of the Vistula Lagoon, about 30 km (19 mi) west of the administrative centre Kaliningrad.

== History ==
The site has been associated with the name of St. Adalbert of Prague, who was sent with soldiers of Bolesław I the Brave of the newly established Poland to Christianize Prussia. St. Adalbert was beheaded nearby in 997 by the pagan Sambians after he destroyed their sacred oak grove. Several further attempts of conquest by Poles followed, but were successfully repelled. In 1254 Sambia was conquered by forces of the Teutonic Order, led by King Ottokar II of Bohemia, during the Prussian Crusade.

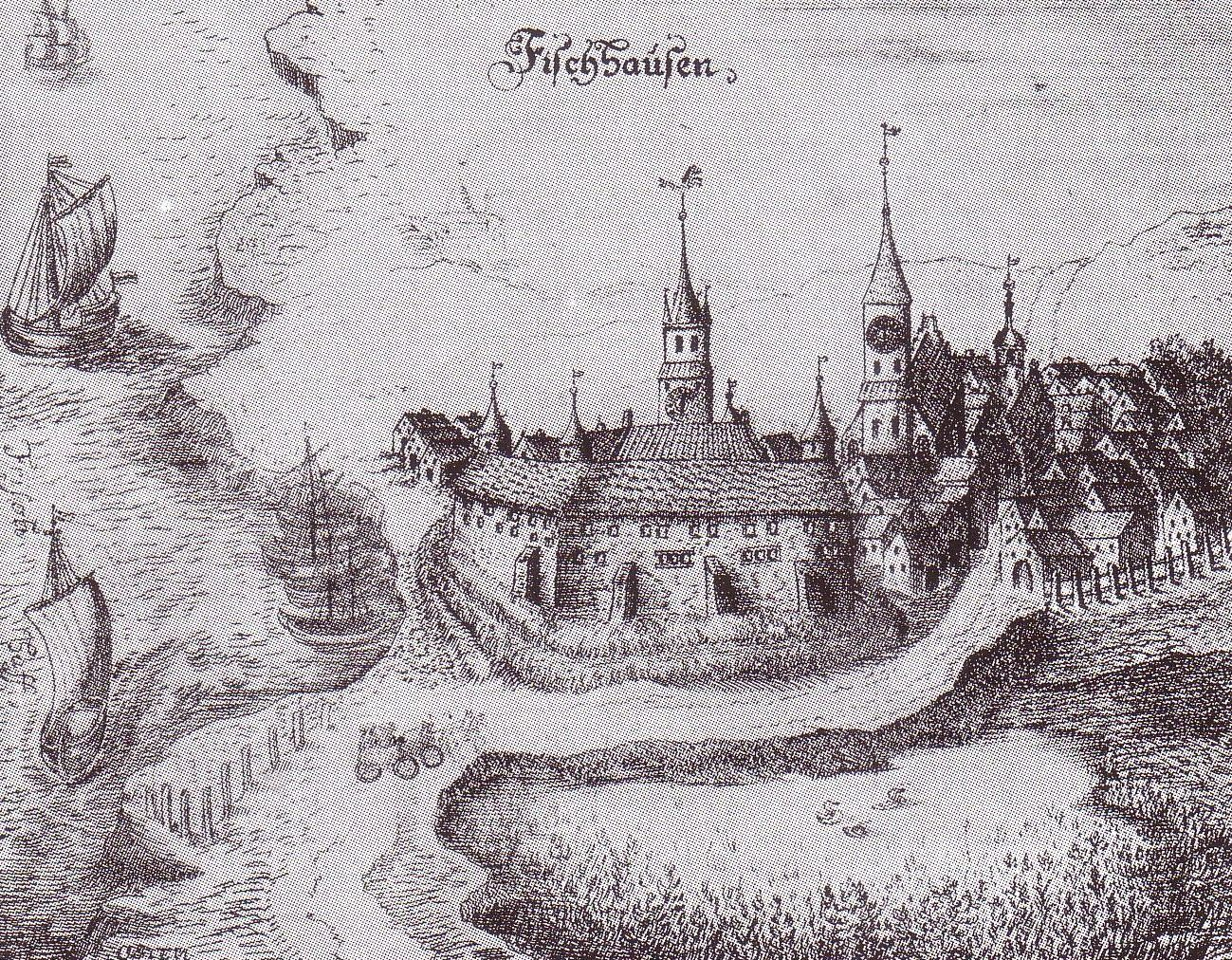
Fischhausen, copper engraving, 1684

Upon the division of the conquered lands, the Bishop of Sambia had a castle erected at the site named Schonewik (derived from Old Prussian: Skanevīs). First mentioned in a 1268 deed, it is one of the oldest in the region. A settlement was laid out from 1299 onwards and its citizens, mainly descending from Stralsund in the Danish Principality of Rügen, received a first town charter in 1305. As the episcopal residence of the Sambian bishops, it was called Bischoveshusen or shortly Vischhusen from about 1325. The richly endowed Gothic parish church was one of the oldest in the province.

In 1454, King Casimir IV Jagiellon incorporated the region to the Kingdom of Poland upon the request of the anti-Teutonic Order Prussian Confederation. After the subsequent Thirteen Years' War (1454–1466), it became a part of Poland as a fief held by the Teutonic Knights. When in 1525 Bishop George of Polentz waived his rights, his Fischhausen residence was incorporated into the secular Duchy of Prussia, a newly formed vassal duchy of Poland. On 12 February 1526, the Hohenzollern duke Albert, former Grand Master of the Teutonic Knights, married Princess Dorothea of Denmark at the Fischhausen Castle chapel. The fortress became the residence of his mentally disabled son Albert Frederick until his death in 1618. Afterwards, the castle decayed. From 1701 on, the town formed part of the Kingdom of Prussia and the castle was finally demolished by order of King Frederick I of Prussia, who had its stones used for the expansion of the nearby Pillau fortress.

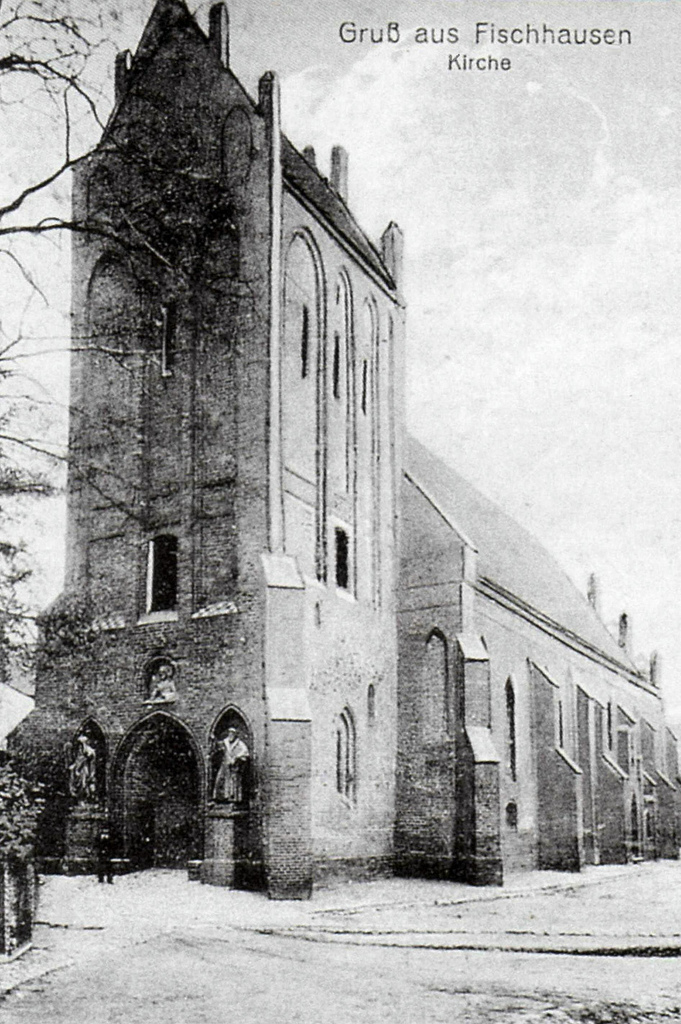
Church about 1930

Upon the re-organisation of the Prussian lands after the Congress of Vienna, Fischhausen became the administrative seat of a district (Kreis Fischhausen) within the Province of East Prussia in 1818. Following the unsuccessful Polish November Uprising, some Polish insurgents were interned in the town in 1831, including Ignacy Domeyko and General Dezydery Chłapowski. A station on the East Prussian Southern Railway line from Königsberg to Pillau with a branch-off to Palmnicken (Yantarny) on the Amber Coast was inaugurated in 1865. From 1871, the town formed part of the German Empire. According to the German 1939 census, the town's population was 3,879.

During World War II, the Soviet Red Army advanced towards Fischhausen after the capture of Königsberg. The town was captured after a battle on April 21–24, 1945; during the fighting the medieval town was almost completely destroyed. After the war, the town was transferred to Soviet control and in 1946 it was given its present name (which literally means "by the sea" in Russian). It finally lost its status as a district seat and was incorporated into Zelenogradsky District in 1947. Part of the newly established Baltiysky District since 1996, it was demoted in status to that of an urban-type settlement in 2005. In 2008, its town status was restored.

== Administrative and municipal status ==
Within the framework of administrative divisions, it is incorporated within Baltiysky District as the town of district significance of Primorsk. As a municipal division, the town of district significance of Primorsk is incorporated within Baltiysky Municipal District as Primorskoye Urban Settlement.

== Notable people ==
- Arthur von Hippel (1841–1916), ophthalmologist
- Wilhelm Wien (1864–1928), physicist
- Dietrich von Saucken (1892–1980), general
- Marie Jonas (1893–1944), physician
- Arno Motulsky (1923–2018), physician and geneticist
