= Narmeln =

Village in Kaliningrad Oblast, Russia

Narmeln Нармельн Narmeln, Polski (German)
- Abandoned village (abolished)
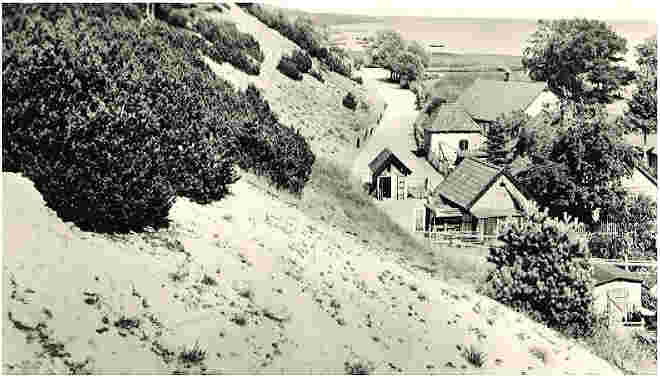
- View of Narmeln (before 1930)
- Interactive map of Narmeln
- Location of Narmeln Narmeln (Kaliningrad Oblast)
- Coordinates: 54°28′01″N 19°40′06″E
- Country: Russia
- Federal subject: Kaliningrad Oblast
- Administrative district: Baltiysky District
- Coaching inn: 1489
- Abolished: 1945

Area
  - Total: 0.6 km^{2} (0.23 sq mi)

Population
  - Estimate (1970): 0 )

Narmeln (Russian: Нармельн, Polish: Polski), alternatively known as Polski, is an abandoned village in Baltiysky District of Kaliningrad Oblast, Russia. It is located on the Vistula Spit, on the border with Poland, the westernmost point of Russia.

Narmeln is distinct as it is one of the few places in Kaliningrad Oblast whose German name was not officially changed when the territory was annexed to the Soviet Union following World War II, and is also the only part of historic Gdańsk Pomerania to be annexed by the Soviet Union by the Potsdam Agreement. Narmeln was depopulated after the war, and the Soviet side of the Vistula Spit was made into an exclusion zone, which remains in effect today.

== Geographical location ==
Narmeln is located about 35 kilometres (22 miles) south-west of Baltiysk. The westernmost point of Russia is located on the Poland–Russia border nearby. (54°27′29.4″N 19°38′21″E)

== History ==
=== Coaching inn and border station ===
In 1466, following the Thirteen Years' War, the longest of all Polish–Teutonic wars, the Teutonic Order renounced any claims to the area and recognized it as part of the Kingdom of Poland. The southern part of the Vistula Spit had been given by King Casimir IV Jagiellon to the city of Danzig (Gdańsk). In 1489 the innkeeper Hans Voyte got the permission to open a coaching inn in a place called Ermelen. The settlement was a possession of the city of Gdańsk, located in the Pomeranian Voivodeship in the province of Royal or Polish Prussia in the Greater Poland Province of the Kingdom of Poland. In 1525 it became a border station between the territories of Gdańsk in Poland and the Duchy of Prussia, a vassal duchy of Poland.

Narmeln was annexed by the Kingdom of Prussia in 1793, in the Second Partition of Poland. During the era of Napoleon Bonaparte the village was a border settlement of the Free City of Danzig (Gdańsk) in the period extending from 1807 to 1814. In 1815 it was reannexed by Prussia, and became part of the province of West Prussia, and from 1871 it was also part of Germany.

In the interbellum, after the creation of the Free City of Danzig in accordance with the terms of the Versailles Treaty Narmeln was joined with the area around Elbing (Elbląg) to the German province of East Prussia.

=== World War II ===
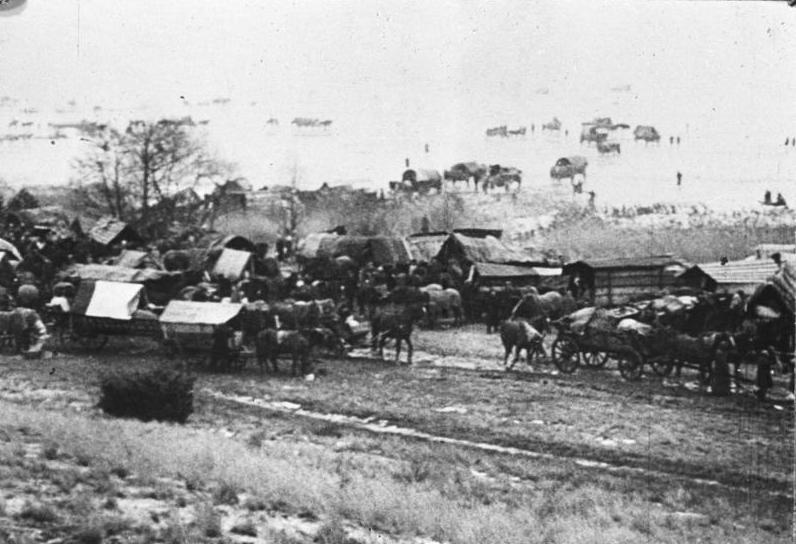
East Prussian Refugees after crossing the Lagoon

Following Germany's invasion of Poland at the start of World War II, the village was included in the newly formed province of Reichsgau Danzig-West Prussia, the bulk of which was German-occupied Polish Pomerania. In 1945 the spit was the last holdout of the remaining German soldiers in East and West Prussia. After the occupation of Tolkemit (Tolkmicko) on January 26, the German refugees fled over the ice of the Vistula Lagoon from Passarge (Nowa Pasłęka) to Narmeln. The village was eventually captured by the Red Army on April 30, 1945.

=== Post-war changes ===
Historical population
Year	Pop.	±%
1905	242	—
1910	257	+6.2%
1920	274	+6.6%
1933	278	+1.5%
1939	294	+5.8%

After the war, the settlement passed to the Soviet Union and the German inhabitants were expelled in accordance with the Potsdam Agreement. Narmeln was the only settlement of historic Gdańsk (Eastern) Pomerania, which had been transferred to the Soviets. Located almost on the border to Poland the village became a deserted place. Border crossings are not allowed on the spit, the Russian part is an exclusion zone.

=== Historical names ===
Ermelen (1489), Narmeln (after 1489), Narmeln, Polski (1660), Narmeln, Polski, Polsk (until 1945).

== Nature ==
Narmeln had been famous for the largest moving dune with a height between 26 and 45 meters on the Vistula spit. In 1926 a youth hostel had been opened.
