= Baltiysky District, Kaliningrad Oblast =

Baltiysky District Балтийский район (Russian)
- District
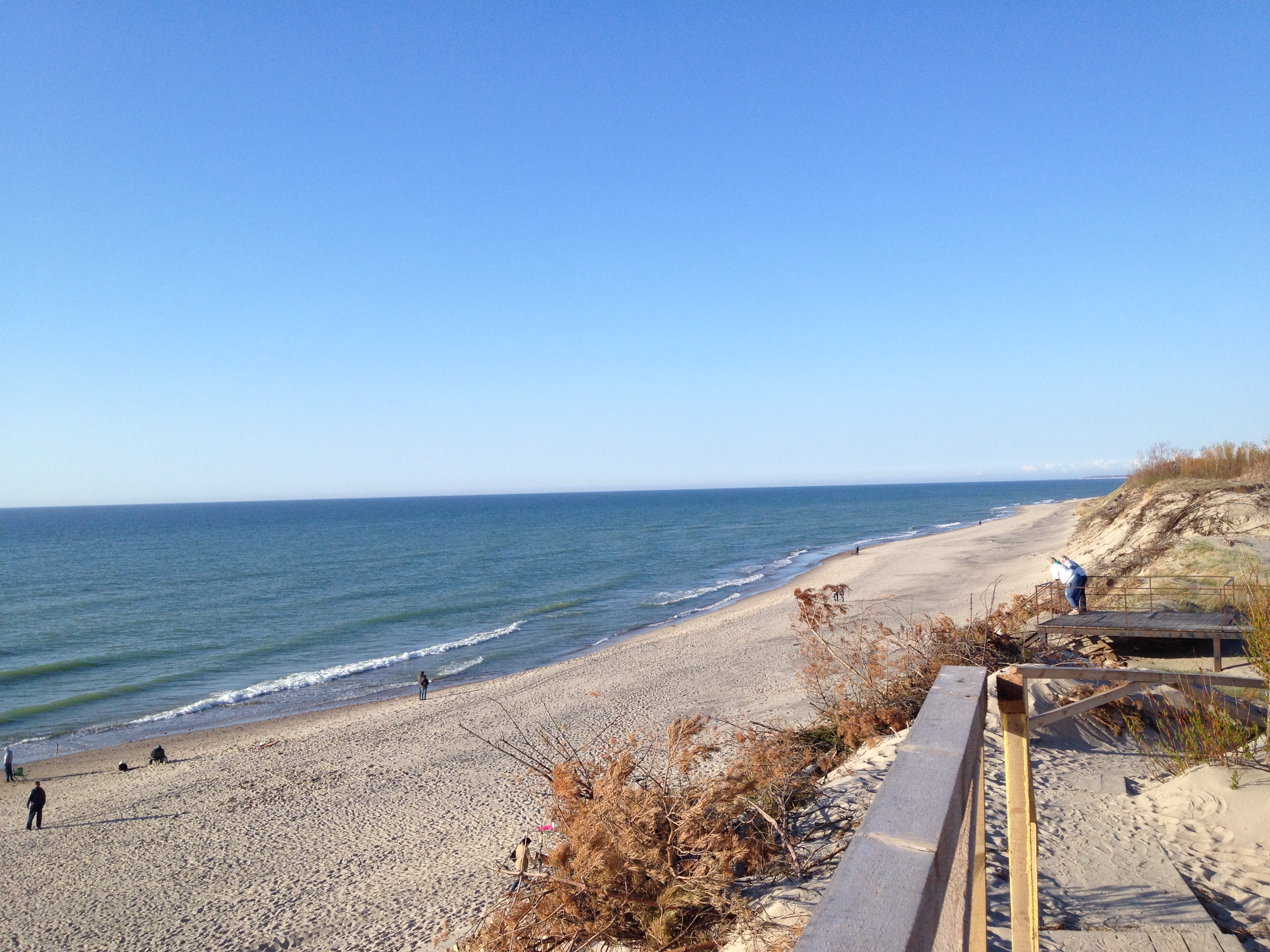
- Vistula Spit, Baltiysky District

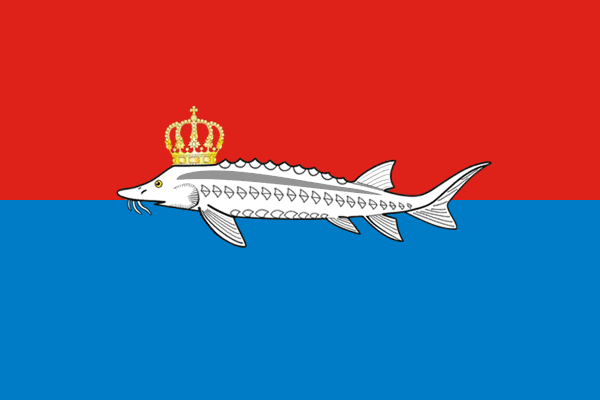
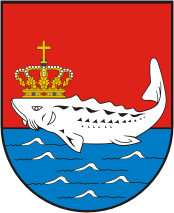
- Flag Coat of arms
- Location of Baltiysky District in Kaliningrad Oblast
- Coordinates: 54°39′N 19°55′E
- Country: Russia
- Federal subject: Kaliningrad Oblast
- Administrative center: Baltiysk

Area
  - Total: 101 km^{2} (39 sq mi)

Population (2010 Census)
  - Total: 36,047
  - Density: 357/km^{2} (924/sq mi)
  - Urban: 96.1%
  - Rural: 3.9%

Administrative structure
  - Administrative divisions: 2 Towns of district significance, 1 Rural okrugs
  - Inhabited localities: 2 cities/towns, 10 rural localities

Municipal structure
  - Municipally incorporated as: Baltiysky Municipal District
  - Municipal divisions: 2 urban settlements, 1 rural settlements
- Time zone: UTC+2 (MSK–1)
- OKTMO ID: 27605000
- Website: http://www.baltijsk.net

Baltiysky District (Russian: Балтийский район) is an administrative district (raion), one of the fifteen in Kaliningrad Oblast, Russia. As a municipal division, it is incorporated as Baltiysky Municipal District. Its administrative center is the town of Baltiysk, which accounts for 90.7% of the district's total population of 36,047 (2010 census). It is the westernmost district in Russia, with the abandoned village of Narmeln being the westernmost point.

Baltiysky District is located on the Sambia Peninsula in the west of the oblast along the Baltic Sea coast, and partially forms the Vistula Lagoon. The area of the district is 101 square kilometers (39 sq mi), with roughly half consisting of the Russian side of the Vistula Spit, which is an unpopulated exclusion zone except for a small portion on the northern tip that is part of Baltiysk. Baltiysky District shares a border with Zelenogradsky District in the north, and an international border with Poland in the south.
