= Heinrich Wilhelm Poll =

German physician, geneticist and physical anthropologist

Heinrich Wilhelm Poll (5 August 1877 – 12 June 1939) was a German physician, geneticist and physical anthropologist. He studied hybridization, fertility, studies of twins, and the applications of genetics to society. He was an advisor for the committee for racial hygiene of the Prussian State Health Council and a member of the society for racial hygiene. He was forced to leave Germany in 1932 as a "non-Aryan" and died at Lund.

== Life and work ==
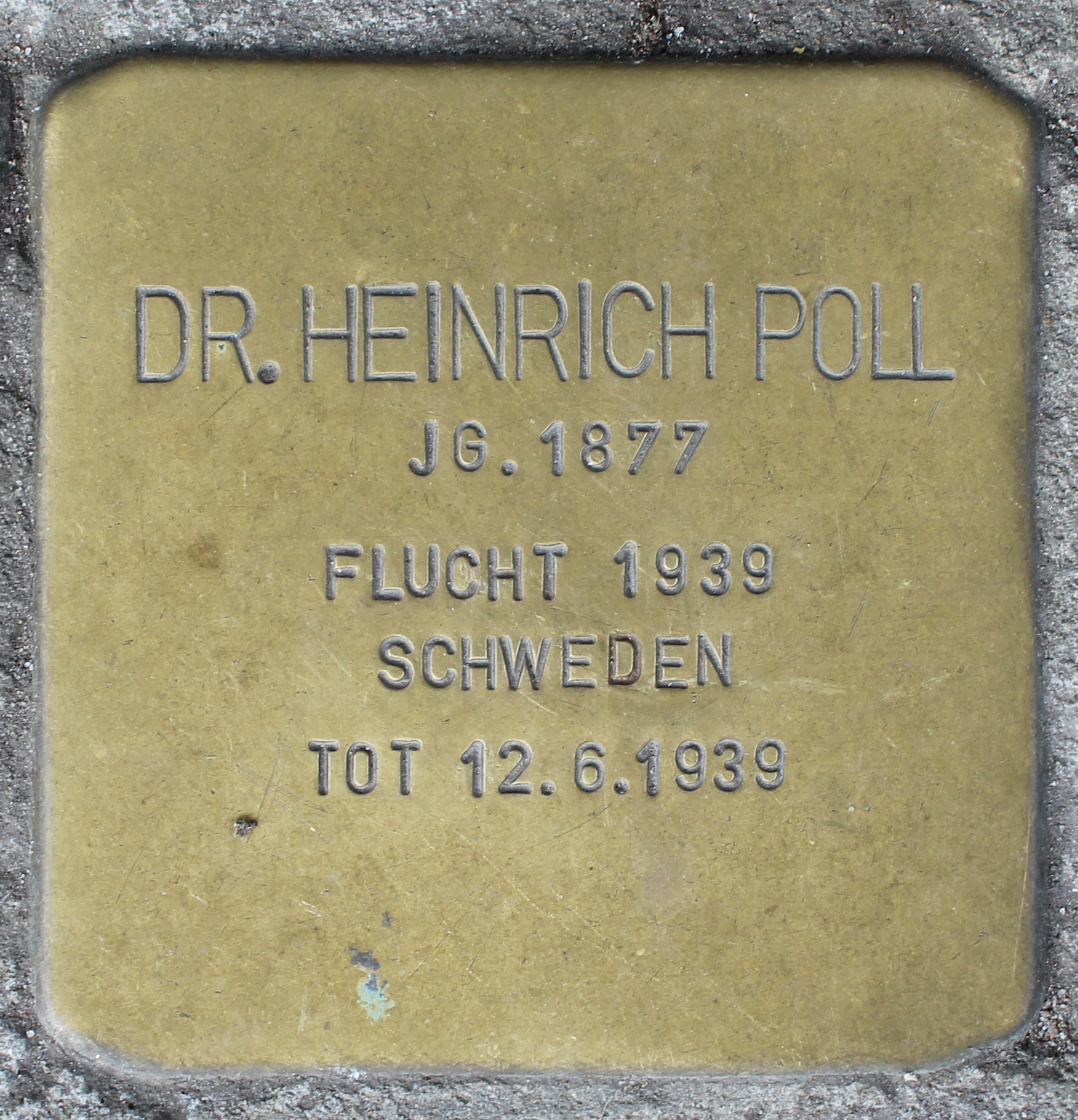

Poll was born in Berlin to engineer Moritz and his wife Julie. Although the parents were Jewish he was converted to Protestantism in 1899. He grew up studying in Berlin and became interested in the natural sciences and after school at the Friedrich-Gymnasium, he went to study medicine from 1895 and passed the preliminary examination in 1897. His influences included the anatomists Wilhelm von Waldeyer and Wilhelm Krause. He worked as an assistant to Oscar Hertwig at the Anatomisch-Biologisches Institut in the Friedrich Wilhelm University in Berlin. His studies were on the adrenal gland and his doctoral dissertation was titled Veraenderungen der Nebenniere bei Transplantation (Changes to the Adrenal Gland in Transplantation, 1900). In 1902 he studied the structure and variation of the skull of humans (especially a large collection of skulls of the Moriori people from Chatham Island made by Hugo Schauinsland) and expressed doubts on the validity of the anthropometric method. He completed his habilitation in 1904 and have a public lecture titled Ueber die Bewertung anthropologischer Reihen (On the Evaluation of Anthropological Series). Unlike the usual practice of taking degrees in different universities, Poll completed all his studies at the University of Berlin. In 1907 he was a titular professor at Berlin and became an associate professor only in 1922. In 1913 he published a book Die Entwicklung des Menschen (The Development of the Human Being). During World War I he served as a field doctor. In 1924 he was appointed professor of anatomy at the University of Hamburg. In the 1920s he was particularly interested in the studies of twins, looking at the resemblance of fingerprints and other features among twins. Poll believed that fingerprints might reveal conditions such as mental illness. He also studied bird hybridization and fertility under Oscar Hertwig.

In 1932 he was reported by Heinz Lohmann as a "non-Aryan" and claimed to be incompetent. He was then forced to give up his academic position. He lived for a while in Berlin while his physician wife Clara tried to resume work as a gynaecologist. He had worked with the Rockefeller Foundation and was hoping for support from the US but was unable to receive any emergency assistance. He then moved to Sweden with support from Herman Nilsson-Ehle and Arne Müntzing to work at the University of Lund in 1939. He died of a heart attack shortly after reaching Lund. His wife Clara Poll-Cords reached Sweden a bit later due to bureaucratic delays and she committed suicide on August 5th, her husband's birthday.

A stolperstein in front of the University Hospital at Hamburg-Eppendorf commemorates his life.
