= Marie Jonas =

German physician and Holocaust victim

Marie Anna Jonas, née Levinsohn (12 January 1893 in Fischhausen – 1944 in Auschwitz), was a medical doctor and a Holocaust victim.

== Early life ==
Jonas was born in Fischhausen, East Prussia (now Primorsk, Kaliningrad Oblast) in 1893, and moved to Königsberg in 1895, where she attended the höhere Mädchenschule, qualifying to become a teacher. She then worked for a year as an au pair in England, and then as a teacher. She was a Red Cross nurse in World War I, as was her elder sister, and received the Honour Cross of the World War 1914/1918 in 1934 for those services in the war. After the war she gained her abitur, and then studied medicine at the University of Königsberg, qualifying to practice in 1923. She married Dr. Alberto Jonas, a classics scholar and senior teacher at the Talmud Tora School for boys in Hamburg. When her husband became principal of the Israelitischen Töchterschule, a girls' school, in 1924, she became its school doctor. Their only child, daughter Esther, was born on 13 March 1924. The family lived in the Grindel suburb of Hamburg until 1925, and then moved to Eppendorf. In 1932, she was laid off, and did voluntary work in the University Medical Center Hamburg-Eppendorf and then the Israelitischen Krankenhaus. In 1940, her husband became the last headmaster of the Talmud Tora School.

== Deportation ==
On 19 July 1942, Jonas was deported with her husband and daughter to Theresienstadt. Dr. Alberto Jonas died six weeks later of meningitis. Jonas worked as a doctor. Her daughter Esther married in Theresienstadt and was transported to Auschwitz with her husband, who was murdered there. On 12 October 1944, Jonas was deported to Auschwitz and was murdered there. Her daughter Esther survived.

== Honours ==
A Stolperstein ("stumbling stone") has been laid in front of the house in Woldsenweg in Eppendorf, Hamburg, where she lived. The square on the corner of Eppendorfer Landstraße and Kümmellstraße was named Marie-Jonas-Platz on 19 February 2009 at a ceremony attended by her daughter.
