= List of Stolpersteine in Hanover =

Memorial installations in Germany

Stolpersteine for Kurt Schwitters and his son Ernst at Waldhausenstraße 5, laid in November 2015

This is a list of stolpersteine that were laid in Hanover, Germany, as part of a project by the artist Gunter Demnig, to commemorate victims of the Nazis. The first stones were laid on 6 December 2007, and the city's register lists 521 people as of 15 July 2026. Each Stolperstein is a small concrete block with a brass plate set on top and installed into the pavement in front of the building where the victim had their last home. The inscription gives the person's name, year of birth and their fate.

== Project ==
The city coordinates the project with partner organizations. Each stone is paid for by donations. In 2018, the association Netzwerk Erinnerung und Zukunft took over the partner role with the city. The first laying of stones placed 23 memorial markers at 11 addresses. By March 2015 there were 302 stones. The city's remembrance official, Karljosef Kreter, said Hanover had agreed to lay stones for survivors but only after Demnig announced he would stop laying stones there. Since October 2023 all 13 of the city's boroughs have stones.

Of the 521 people in the 2026 register, 445 were Jews. The others include 32 Sinti and Roma, 17 political opponents, 12 gay men, 11 victims of the Nazi "euthanasia" killings and 8 deserters or soldiers convicted of "undermining military morale" (Wehrkraftzersetzung). Included in the remembered are Herschel Grynszpan and his sister Esther, the artist Kurt Schwitters and his son Ernst, the boxer Johann Trollmann, the philosopher Theodor Lessing and his wife Ada, and the politician Kurt Schumacher.

== List by borough ==
The list is grouped by borough (Stadtbezirk) and sorted by address within each borough. Laying dates follow the city's register.

=== Ahlem-Badenstedt-Davenstedt ===
Address	Date laid	Person	Inscription	Image
Davenstedter Straße 156; 52.36597°N 9.68028°E	13 October 2023	Salli Birkenruth	Hier wohnte Salli Birkenruth; Jg. 1882 deportiert 15.12.1941; Ghetto Riga ermordet	
Davenstedter Straße 156; 52.36597°N 9.68028°E	13 October 2023	Johanna Birkenruth	Hier wohnte Johanna Birkenruth geb. Gottschalk; Jg. 1886 deportiert 15.12.1941; Ghetto Riga; KZ Stutthof ermordet	
Heisterbergallee 10	6 November 2025	Margarete Rosenblatt		
Heisterbergallee 10	6 November 2025	Leo Rosenblatt		
Heisterbergallee 10	6 November 2025	Ruth Rosenblatt		
Heisterbergallee 10	6 November 2025	Gerhard Rosenblatt		

=== Bothfeld-Vahrenheide ===
Address	Date laid	Person	Inscription	Image
Vahrenwalder Straße 290; 52.417941°N 9.733905°E	25 May 2022	Frieda Wolff	Hier wohnte Frieda Wolff geb. Magnus; Jg. 1883; Flucht 1938; Uruguay	
Vahrenwalder Straße 290; 52.417941°N 9.733905°E	25 May 2022	Gottlieb Wolff	Hier wohnte Gottlieb Wolff; Jg. 1885 'Schutzhaft' 1938; Buchenwald; Flucht 1938; Uruguay	
Vahrenwalder Straße 290; 52.417941°N 9.733905°E	25 May 2022	Emilie Magnus	Hier wohnte Emilie Magnus geb. Katz; Jg. 1851 gedemütigt/entrechtet unfreiwillig verzogen Hamburg tot 18.1.1939	
Vahrenwalder Straße 290; 52.417941°N 9.733905°E	25 May 2022	Hulda Magnus	Hier wohnte Hulda Magnus geb. Magnus; Jg. 1885; Flucht 1939 Holland interniert Westerbork deportiert 1942; Auschwitz ermordet 31.8.1942	
Vahrenwalder Straße 290; 52.417941°N 9.733905°E	25 May 2022	Sally Magnus	Hier wohnte Sally Magnus; Jg. 1881 'Schutzhaft' 1938; Buchenwald; Flucht 1939 Holland interniert Westerbork deportiert 1942; Auschwitz ermordet 31.8.1942	
Vahrenwalder Straße 290; 52.417941°N 9.733905°E	25 May 2022	Otto Günther Magnus	Hier wohnte Otto Günther Magnus; Jg. 1929; Flucht 1938; Uruguay	
Vahrenwalder Straße 290; 52.417941°N 9.733905°E	25 May 2022	Henni Rottenberg	Hier wohnte Henni Rottenberg geb. Magnus; Jg. 1886 'Polenaktion' 1938; Bentschen/Zbaszyn ermordet	
Vahrenwalder Straße 290; 52.417941°N 9.733905°E	25 May 2022	Isaak Rottenberg	Hier wohnte Isaak Rottenberg; Jg. 1886 verhaftet 17.10.1939; Buchenwald; 1940 Dachau ermordet 12.2.1941	

=== Buchholz-Kleefeld ===
Address	Date laid	Person	Inscription	Image
Berckhusenstraße 27; 52.37424°N 9.79049°E	13 October 2023	Hermann Israel	Hier wohnte Hermann Israel; Jg. 1896 'Schutzhaft' 1938; KZ Buchenwald; Flucht 1938 Holland interniert Westerbork deportiert 1944; Theresienstadt; Auschwitz ermordet	
Berckhusenstraße 27; 52.37424°N 9.79049°E	13 October 2023	Else Israel	Hier wohnte Else Israel geb. Katz; Jg. 1902 deportiert 15.12.1941; Ghetto Riga ermordet	
Berckhusenstraße 27; 52.37424°N 9.79049°E	13 October 2023	Helmut Israel	Hier wohnte Helmut Israel; Jg. 1935 deportiert 15.12.1941; Ghetto Riga ermordet	
Berckhusenstraße 27; 52.37424°N 9.79049°E	13 October 2023	Jenny Katz	Hier wohnte Jenny Katz geb. Windmüller; Jg. 1873 deportiert 15.12.1941; Ghetto Riga ermordet	
Berckhusenstraße 32; 52.3749185°N 9.7938334°E	12 June 2013	Heinrich Bock	Hier wohnte Heinrich Bock; Jg. 1899 im Widerstand/SPD verhaftet 1944; Aktion ‘Gewitter’ Polizeigefängnis Ahlem; 1944 Neuengamme tot 3.5.1945; MS Cap Arcona	Stolperstein für Heinrich Bock in Hannover
Kirchröder Straße 18; 52.37110°N 9.79580°E	26 September 2018	Martin Frommhold	Hier wohnte Dr. Martin; Frommhold; Jg. 1880 mehrfach denunziert Flucht in den Tod; 10.4.1933	Stolperstein für Martin Frommhold in Hannover
Kirchröder Straße 18; 52.37110°N 9.79580°E	11 July 2019	Wolfgang Frommhold	Hier wohnte Wolfgang Frommhold; Jg. 1909 eingewiesen 1923; Rotenburger Anstalten 'verlegt’ 1.10.1941; Heilanstalt Sorau ermordet 10.1.1942	Stolperstein für Wolfgang Frommhold in Hannover
Kirchröder Straße 100; 52.37234°N 9.78684°E	23 March 2010	Otto Rischbieter	Hier wohnte Otto Rischbieter; Jg. 1897 denunziert verhaftet 1941 'Wehrkraftzersetzung' erschossen 27.1.1943; Zuchthaus Brandenburg	Stolperstein für Otto Rischbieter in Hannover
Podbielskistraße 274; 52.40195°N 9.78878°E	4 December 2012	Michael Umansky	Hier wohnte Michael Umansky; Jg. 1897 denunziert verhaftet 8.7.1944; Ahlem; 1944 Auschwitz; Stutthof; Natzweiler/Hailfingen tot 23.11.1944	Stolperstein für Michael Umansky in Hannover
Wallmodenstraße 14; 52.37234°N 9.79300°E	13 October 2023	Joseph Cohn	Hier wohnte Joseph Cohn; Jg. 1871 gedemütigt/entrechtet Flucht in den Tod; 12. März 1939	
Wallmodenstraße 14; 52.37234°N 9.79300°E	13 October 2023	Frieda Cohn	Hier wohnte Frieda Cohn geb. Blanke; Jg. 1879 gedemütigt/entrechtet Flucht in den Tod; 12. März 1939	

=== Döhren-Wülfel ===
Address	Date laid	Person	Inscription	Image
Brandestraße 11; 52.345618°N 9.763635°E	6 November 2025	Dunia Schwarzmann	Hier wohnte Dunia Schwarzmann geb. Goldenberg; Jg. 1869 deportiert 15.12.1941; Ghetto Riga ermordet	File:Stolperstein für Dunia Schwarzmann in Hannover
Brandestraße 24; 52.34574°N 9.76516°E	7 December 2017	Sophie Leser	Hier wohnte Sophie Leser; Jg. 1867 seit 1939 im Alters- und Pflegeheim Wilkening; 1942 Jacoby’sche Anstalt; Bendorf-Sayn deportiert 27.7.1942; Theresienstadt ermordet 18.8.1942	Stolperstein für Sophie Leser in Hannover
Brandestraße 24; 52.34574°N 9.76516°E	7 December 2017	Emma Marta Binheim	Hier wohnte Emma Marta; Binheim; Jg. 1888 seit 1938 im Alters- und Pflegeheim Wilkening deportiert 15.12.1941 ermordet in Riga	Stolperstein für Emma Marta Binheim in Hannover
Brandestraße 24; 52.34574°N 9.76516°E	7 December 2017	Sofie Quindel	Hier wohnte Sofie Quindel geb. Glaser; Jg. 1870 seit 1940 im Alters- und Pflegeheim Wilkening 'verlegt' 27.9.1940; Brandenburg ermordet 27.9.1940 'Aktion T4'	Stolperstein für Sofie Quindel in Hannover
Hildesheimer Straße 109; 52.35656°N 9.75350°E	23 March 2010	Rosa Abrahamsohn	Hier wohnte Rosa Abrahamsohn geb. Sichel; Jg. 1861 deportiert ermordet in Auschwitz	File:Stolperstein für Rosa Abrahamsohn in Hannover
Hildesheimer Straße 377; 52.32807°N 9.77788°E	23 March 2010	Else Wertheim	Hier wohnte Else Wertheim geb. Grünberg; Jg. 1861 deportiert 15.12.1941 tot in Riga	File:Stolperstein für Else Wertheim in Hannover
Hildesheimer Straße 377; 52.32807°N 9.77788°E	23 March 2010	Salomon Grünberg	Hier wohnte Salomon Grünberg; Jg. 1887 deportiert 15.12.1941 tot in Riga	File:Stolperstein für Salomon Grünberg in Hannover
Lechstraße 2; 52.33726°N 9.76601°E	22 March 2010	Fritz Meyerhof	Hier wohnte Fritz Meyerhof; Jg. 1880 deportiert 15.12.1941 tot in Riga	Stolperstein für Fritz Meyerhof in Hannover
Lechstraße 2; 52.33726°N 9.76601°E	22 March 2010	Käthe Meyerhof	Hier wohnte Käthe Meyerhof geb. Ehrlich; Jg. 1885 deportiert 15.12.1941 tot in Riga	Stolperstein für Käthe Meyerhof in Hannover
Waldhausenstraße 5; 52.34695°N 9.76211°E	20 November 2015	Ernst Schwitters	Hier wohnte Ernst Schwitters; Jg. 1918; Flucht 1936; Norwegen; 1940 England	Stolperstein für Ernst Schwitters in Hannover
Waldhausenstraße 5; 52.34695°N 9.76211°E	20 November 2015	Kurt Schwitters	Hier wohnte Kurt Schwitters; Jg. 1887; Flucht 1937; Norwegen; England	Stolperstein für Kurt Schwitters in Hannover
Waldhausenstraße 5	30 June 2026	Hewig Mahlstedt		
Wolfstraße 36; 52.35196°N 9.77991°E	7 December 2017	Marie Kahle	Hier wohnte Marie Kahle; Jg. 1898 seit 1937 im Alters- und Pflegeheim Wilkening 'verlegt' 5.6.1941; Hadamar ermordet 5.6.1941 'Aktion T4'	File:Stolperstein für Marie Kahle in Hannover
Wolfstraße 36; 52.35196°N 9.77991°E	7 December 2017	Georg Neufeld	Hier wohnte Georg Neufeld; Jg. 1888 seit 1938 im Alters- und Pflegeheim Wilkening deportiert 1942; Ghetto Warschau ermordet	File:Stolperstein für Georg Neufeld in Hannover

=== Herrenhausen-Stöcken ===
Address	Date laid	Person	Inscription	Image
Berggartenstraße 2; 52.3941°N 9.6950°E	6 December 2007	Friedrich Schwarz	Hier wohnte Friedrich Schwarz; Jg. 1886 verhaftet Neuengamme tot 3.4.1943	Stolperstein für Friedrich Schwarz in Hannover
Hasenberg 1; 52.397723°N 9.673257°E	11 July 2019	Hans Freudenthal	Hier wohnte Dr. Hans Freudenthal; Jg. 1898 deportiert 28.6.1943; Theresienstadt ermordet in Auschwitz	Stolperstein für Dr. Hans Freudenthal in Hannover
Herrenhäuser Straße 64; 52.39318°N 9.68579°E	7 December 2017	Erich Busch	Hier wohnte Erich Busch; Jg. 1916; Todesurteil 1940; Feldgericht Division 17; Hannover erschossen 13.3.1940; Schiessstände; Vahrenwalder Heide	Stolperstein für Erich Busch
Sommerfeldstraße 25; 52.41246°N 9.69130°E	6 October 2014	Friedrich Klug	Hier wohnte Friedrich Klug; Jg. 1908 im Widerstand / SF verhaftet 1936; Zuchthaus Hameln; 1942 Strafdivision 999 tot 5.9.1943 Patras	Stolperstein für Friedrich Klug

=== Kirchrode-Bemerode-Wülferode ===
Address	Date laid	Person	Inscription	Image
Brabeckstraße 86; 52.35220°N 9.82699°E	13 November 2008	Emmy Steinfeld	Hier wohnte Emmy Steinfeld geb. Rinteln; Jg. 1864 deportiert 1942; Theresienstadt ermordet in Treblinka	
Brabeckstraße 86; 52.35220°N 9.82699°E	13 November 2008	Ida Steinfeld	Hier wohnte Ida Steinfeld geb. Hirschfeld; Jg. 1869 deportiert 1942; Theresienstadt ermordet in Treblinka	
Großer Hillen 38; 52.35976°N 9.82093°E	30 September 2016	Lina Spiegelberg	Hier wohnte Lina Spiegelberg; Jg. 1880 deportiert 15.12.1941 ermordet in Riga	File:Stolperstein für Lina Spiegelberg in Hannover

=== Linden-Limmer ===
Address	Date laid	Person	Inscription	Image
Beethovenstraße 10; 52.36807°N 9.70960°E	12 June 2013	Gertrud Lenzberg	Hier wohnte Gertrud Lenzberg; Jg. 1890 gedemütigt/entrechtet Flucht in den Tod; 8.8.1938	
Beethovenstraße 10; 52.36807°N 9.70960°E	12 June 2013	Marie Lenzberg	Hier wohnte Marie Lenzberg; Jg. 1886 gedemütigt/entrechtet Flucht in den Tod; 8.8.1938	
Bredenbeckerstraße 4; 52.360411°N 9.713121°E	6 November 2025	Ludwig Kollmannsberger	Hier wohnte Ludwig Kollmannsberger; Jg. 1890; Verhaftet 20.9.1944; Polizeigefängnis Ahlem; Flucht in den Tod; 19. Okt. 1944	
Deisterstraße 16; 52.36692°N 9.71951°E	3 March 2009	Herbert August Erhardt	Hier wohnte Herbert August; Erhardt; Jg. 1901 verhaftet KZ Natzweiler tot 18.1.1942	Stolperstein für Herbert August Erhardt in Hannover
Deisterstraße 23; 52.36569°N 9.71937°E	7 October 2011	Amalie Meyer	Hier wohnte Amalie Meyer geb. Nussbaum; Jg. 1880 deportiert 15.12.1941 tot in Riga	
Deisterstraße 23; 52.36569°N 9.71937°E	7 October 2011	Norbert Kronenberg	Hier wohnte Norbert; Kronenberg; Jg. 1908 deportiert 15.12.1941 tot in Riga	
Egestorffstraße 14; 52.36720°N 9.71221°E	26 September 2018	Karl Wrampe	Hier wohnte Karl Wrampe; Jg. 1906 seit 1935 mehrfach verhaftet verurteilt 1941 § 175; 1942 Organisation Todt inhaftiert bei Oslo überlebt	Stolperstein für Karl Wrampe in Hannover
Falkenstraße 1; 52.36723°N 9.71927°E	18 September 2013	Hermann Blumenthal	Hier wohnte Hermann; Blumenthal; Jg. 1866; Opfer des Pogroms 'Schutzhaft’ 1938; Buchenwald tot an den Folgen; 19.12.1938	Stolperstein für Hermann Blumenthal in Hannover
Franz-Nause-Straße 4; 52.37582°N 9.69394°E	7 December 2017	Max Goldschmidt	Hier wohnte Max Goldschmidt; Jg. 1876 deportiert 15.12.1941 ermordet in Riga	
Franz-Nause-Straße 4; 52.37582°N 9.69394°E	7 December 2017	Regine Goldschmidt	Hier wohnte Regine Goldschmidt geb. Baum; Jg. 1876 deportiert 15.12.1941 ermordet in Riga	
Kesselstraße 19; 52.37503°N 9.69062°E	22 March 2010	Franz Nause	Hier wohnte Franz Nause; Jg. 1903 verhaftet 1933; 1937 Zuchthaus Hameln tot an Haftfolgen; 20.3.1943; Zuchthaus Brandenburg	Stolperstein für Franz Nause in Hannover
Laportestraße 24a 52.36237°N 9.72050°E	30 September 2016	Margot Katz	Hier wohnte Margot Katz; Jg. 1923; Flucht 1935; USA	
Laportestraße 24a 52.36237°N 9.72050°E	30 September 2016	Meta Katz	Hier wohnte Meta Katz geb. Proskauer; Jg. 1894; Flucht 1939; Shanghai	
Laportestraße 24a 52.36237°N 9.72050°E	30 September 2016	Oskar Katz	Hier wohnte Oskar Katz; Jg. 1893; Flucht 1939; Shanghai	
Limmerstraße 2d 52.371539°N 9.713236°E	25 May 2022	Dr. Sigmund Kohn	Hier wohnte Dr. Sigmund Kohn; Jg. 1877 gedemütigt/entrechtet Flucht in den Tod; 14.2.1942	
Limmerstraße 2d 52.371539°N 9.713236°E	25 May 2022	Johanna Kohn	Hier wohnte Johanna Kohn geb. Cohn; Jg. 1889 deportiert 1942; Ghetto Warschau ermordet	
Limmerstraße 50; 52.37405°N 9.70693°E	18 September 2013	Elsa Cranz	Hier wohnte Elsa Cranz geb. Boje; Jg. 1917; Zeugin Jehovas verhaftet 'verlegt’ 14.11.1942; Ravensbrück tot 29.11.1943	Stolperstein für Elsa Cranz in Hannover
Limmerstraße 71; 52.37434°N 9.70423°E	13 November 2008	Ernst Schünemann	Hier wohnte Ernst Schünemann; Jg. 1897 verhaftet 1939; Zuchthaus; Krankenhaus Hameln tot an Haftfolgen; 14.2.1941	
Minister-Stüve-Straße 4; 52.36837°N 9.71894°E	20 November 2015	Adolf Sock	Hier wohnte Adolf Sock; Jg. 1884; Flucht 1939 Belgien interniert Mechelen deportiert 1942 ermordet in Auschwitz	
Minister-Stüve-Straße 4; 52.36837°N 9.71894°E	20 November 2015	Gertrud Sock	Hier wohnte Gertrud Sock geb. Wegner; Jg. 1893; Flucht 1939 Belgien interniert Mechelen deportiert 1942; Auschwitz ermordet 14.9.1942	
Minister-Stüve-Straße 4; 52.36837°N 9.71894°E	20 November 2015	Marianne Sock	Hier wohnte Marianne Sock; Jg. 1921; Flucht 1939 Belgien interniert Mechelen deportiert 1942; Auschwitz ermordet 20.9.1942	
Minister-Stüve-Straße 4; 52.36837°N 9.71894°E	20 November 2015	Hans Sock	Hier wohnte Hans Sock; Jg. 1925; Flucht 1939 Belgien interniert Mechelen deportiert 1942 ermordet in Auschwitz	
Nedderfeldstraße 8; 52.37386°N 9.70937°E	3 March 2009	Wilhelm Bluhm	Hier wohnte Wilhelm Bluhm; Jg. 1898 verhaftet 1936; KZ Sachsenhausen tot 25.7.1942	Stolperstein für Wilhelm Blum in Hannover
Rampenstraße 5; 52.37001°N 9.71168°E	30 September 2016	Otto Schartenberg	Hier wohnte Otto Schartenberg; Jg. 1875 'Schutzhaft’ 1938; Buchenwald an den Haftfolgen tot 30.11.1938	
Wittekindstraße 11A	6 November 2025	Theodor Heymann		
Wittekindstraße 11A	6 November 2025	Rahel Heymann		
Wittekindstraße 11A	6 November 2025	Heinz Heymann		
Wunstorfer Straße 18; 52.37626°N 9.69405°E	13 November 2008	Margarethe Rüdenberg	Hier wohnte Margarethe Rüdenberg geb. Grünberg; Jg. 1879 deportiert 1942; Theresienstadt tot 29.11.1943	
Wunstorfer Straße 18; 52.37626°N 9.69405°E	13 November 2008	Max Rüdenberg	Hier wohnte Max Rüdenberg; Jg. 1863 deportiert 1942; Theresienstadt tot 26.9.1942	

=== Misburg-Anderten ===
Address	Date laid	Person	Inscription	Image
Anderter Straße 22; 52.38808°N 9.85706°E	6 October 2014	Charlotte Croner	Hier wohnte Charlotte Croner geb. Hirschfeld; Jg. 1882 deportiert 31.3.1942; Ghetto Warschau ermordet	Stolperstein für Charlotte Croner in Hannover
Anderter Straße 22; 52.38808°N 9.85706°E	6 October 2014	Emma Hirschfeld	Hier wohnte Emma Hirschfeld; Jg. 1880 deportiert 31.3.1942; Ghetto Warschau ermordet	Stolperstein für Emma Hirschfeld in Hannover
Anderter Straße 22; 52.38808°N 9.85706°E	6 October 2014	Natalie Hirschfeld	Hier wohnte Natalie Hirschfeld; Jg. 1875 deportiert 31.3.1942; Ghetto Warschau ermordet	Stolperstein für Natalie Hirschfeld in Hannover
Anderter Straße 22; 52.38808°N 9.85706°E	6 October 2014	Selma Hirschfeld	Hier wohnte Selma Hirschfeld; Jg. 1878 deportiert 23.7.1942; Theresienstadt ermordet in Auschwitz	Stolperstein für Selma Hirschfeld in Hannover
Anderter Straße 140; 52.36945000°N 9.86161667°E	23 March 2010	Anton Macioszyk	Hier wohnte Anton Macioszyk; Jg. 1899 von SA erschlagen 30.6.1933 in Misburg	Stolperstein für Anton Macioszyk in Hannover
Am Tiergarten 39; 52.36219°N 9.84968°E	13 November 2008	Alois Schuchardt	Hier wohnte Alois Schuchardt; Jg. 1910 abgeholt 1940 'Heilanstalt’ Wunstorf ermordet 14.5.1941 in 'Heilanstalt’ Hadamar	Stolperstein für Alois Schuchardt in Hannover
Am Tiergarten 44; 52.36231°N 9.84850°E	6 October 2011	Ada Lessing	Hier wohnte Ada Lessing geb. Abbenthern; Jg. 1883; Flucht 1933; Tschechoslowakei; 1938 England überlebt	Stolperstein für Ada Lessing in Hannover
Am Tiergarten 44; 52.36231°N 9.84850°E	6 October 2011	Theodor Lessing	Hier wohnte Theodor Lessing; Jg. 1872; Flucht 1933; Prag von Nazis ermordet Marienbad tot 31.08.1933	Stolperstein für Theodor Lessing in Hannover

=== Mitte ===
Address	Date laid	Person	Inscription	Image	Notes
Am Marstall 14; 52.37433°N 9.73178°E	13 November 2008	Fraidel Bialystock	Hier wohnte Fraidl Bialystock geb. Bloch; Jg. 1901; Flucht Belgien deportiert 1942 ermordet in Auschwitz		When first laid, the stones were in a different order:
Am Marstall 14; 52.37433°N 9.73178°E	13 November 2008	Chana Bloch	Hier wohnte Chana Bloch geb. Imich; Jg. 1871 deportiert 1941; Riga tot in Stutthof		
Am Marstall 14; 52.37433°N 9.73178°E	13 November 2008	Rosa Bloch	Hier wohnte Rosa Bloch; Jg. 1912; Flucht 1939 Belgien interniert Mechelen deportiert ermordet in Auschwitz		
Am Marstall 18; 52.37419°N 9.73105°E	3 March 2009	Walter Matthes	Hier wohnte Walter Matthes; Jg. 1914 verhaftet 1939; Zuchthaus 'Vorbeugehaft' tot 9.8.1943	Stolperstein für Walter Matthes in Hannover	
An der Börse 3 (Rathenaustraße 3); 52.37251°N 9.74214°E	3 March 2009	Willy Scheinhardt	Hier arbeitete Willy Scheinhardt; Jg. 1892 verhaftet Jan. 1936; Gestapogefängnis; Hildesheim gefoltert tot 6.10.1936	Stolperstein für Willy Scheinhardt in Hannover	After building work at the corner of An der Börse and Sophienstraße, the stone was reset upside down
Archivstraße 3; 52.36980°N 9.72869°E	7 October 2011	Hermann Federmann	Hier wohnte Hermann; Federmann; Jg. 1930 aus Wunstorfer Anstalten 'verlegt’ 27.9.1940; Landes-Pflegeanstalt; Brandenburg ermordet 1940	Stolperstein für Hermann Federmann in Hannover	The stone lies behind the building at Archivstraße 3, on its north side, about where the house at Wagenerstraße 1 once stood
Arndtstraße 2; 52.38122°N 9.72799°E	3 March 2009	Martha Liepmann	Hier wohnte Martha Liepmann geb. Cohen; Jg. 1885 deportiert 1941 tot in Riga	Stolperstein für Maria Liepmann in Hannover	
Berliner Allee 34; 52.37264°N 9.75130°E	20 November 2015	Fritz Frenkel	Hier wohnte Fritz Frenkel; Jg. 1895; Flucht 1938 Holland interniert Westerbork deportiert 1944; Theresienstadt ermordet 30.9.1944	Stolperstein für Fritz Frenkel in Hannover	
Berliner Allee 34; 52.37264°N 9.75130°E	20 November 2015	Julius Frenkel	Hier wohnte Julius Frenkel; Jg. 1900 deportiert 15.12.1941 ermordet in Riga	Stolperstein für Julius Frenkel in Hannover	
Berliner Allee 34; 52.37264°N 9.75130°E	20 November 2015	Henny Frenkel	Hier wohnte Henny Frenkel; Jg. 1887 deportiert 15.12.1941 ermordet in Riga	Stolperstein für Henny Frenkel in Hannover	
Berliner Allee 34; 52.37264°N 9.75130°E	20 November 2015	Grete Frenkel	Hier wohnte Grete Frenkel; Jg. 1891 deportiert 15.12.1941 ermordet in Riga	Stolperstein für Grete Frenkel in Hannover	
Berliner Allee 34; 52.37264°N 9.75130°E	20 November 2015	Mathilde Frenkel	Hier wohnte Mathilde Frenkel geb. Ahron; Jg. 1857; Flucht 1939 Holland interniert Westerbork tot 12.2.1943	Stolperstein für Mathilde Frenkel in Hannover	
Blumenauer Straße, opposite nos. 11/13. Currently on display at the city archive because of building work at the Ihme-Zentrum (coordinates are those of the archive); 52.367856°N 9.753475°E	3 March 2009	Hans Goldschmidt	Hier wohnte Hans Goldschmidt; Jg. 1902 deportiert 1941 tot in Salaspils		
Blumenauer Straße, opposite nos. 11/13. Currently on display at the city archive because of building work at the Ihme-Zentrum (coordinates are those of the archive); 52.367856°N 9.753475°E	3 March 2009	Hella Goldschmidt	Hier wohnte Hella Goldschmidt geb. Wolfes; Jg. 1913 deportiert 1941; Riga tot 1945 in Schlewe/Pommern		
Blumenauer Straße, opposite nos. 11/13. Currently on display at the city archive because of building work at the Ihme-Zentrum (coordinates are those of the archive); 52.367856°N 9.753475°E	3 March 2009	Johanna Goldschmidt	Hier wohnte Johanna Goldschmidt geb. Neuberg; Jg. 1878; Flucht in den Tod; 25.8.1939		
Blumenauer Straße, opposite nos. 11/13. Currently on display at the city archive because of building work at the Ihme-Zentrum (coordinates are those of the archive); 52.367856°N 9.753475°E	3 March 2009	Else Speier	Hier wohnte Else Speier geb. Goldschmidt; Jg. 1898 deportiert 1941 tot in Riga		
Blumenauer Straße, opposite nos. 11/13. Currently on display at the city archive because of building work at the Ihme-Zentrum (coordinates are those of the archive); 52.367856°N 9.753475°E	3 March 2009	Lore Speier	Hier wohnte Lore Speier; Jg. 1923 deportiert 1941 tot in Riga		
Blumenauer Straße, opposite nos. 11/13. Currently on display at the city archive because of building work at the Ihme-Zentrum (coordinates are those of the archive); 52.367856°N 9.753475°E	3 March 2009	Ludwig Speier	Hier wohnte Ludwig Speier; Jg. 1887 deportiert 1941 tot in Riga		
Bohlendamm 4; 52.37085°N 9.73514°E	6 October 2014	Heinrich Börner	Hier wohnte Heinrich Börner; Jg. 1919; Opfer der Militär-Justiz erschossen 30.4.1940; Schiessstände; Emmich-Cambrai-Kaserne		
Brühlstraße 27; 52.37739°N 9.72361°E	3 March 2009	Martin Schlesinger	Hier wohnte Dr. Martin; Schlesinger; Jg. 1900 deportiert 1941 tot in Riga	der Stolperstein für Dr. Martin Schlesinger	
Brühlstraße 27; 52.37739°N 9.72361°E	3 March 2009	Betty Schlesinger	Hier wohnte Betty; Schlesinger geb. Braun; Jg. 1902 deportiert 1941 tot in Riga	der Stolperstein für Betty Schlesinger	
Burgstraße 36; 52.37172°N 9.73244°E	22 March 2010	Esther Grünspan	Hier wohnte Esther Grünspan; Jg. 1916 abgeschoben 28.10.1937 nach Polen ???		
Burgstraße 36; 52.37172°N 9.73244°E	22 March 2010	Herschel Grünspan	Hier wohnte Herschel; Grünspan; Jg. 1921; Flucht 1936 Frankreich ausgeliefert 1940 von 1943–1945 in einem KZ ???		
Calenberger Straße 15; 52.36995°N 9.72680°E	3 March 2009	Richard Lange	Hier wohnte Richard Lange; Jg. 1903 verhaftet 1939; Zuchthaus 'Vorbeugehaft'; KZ Mauthausen tot 1.9.1942	Stolperstein für Richard Lange in Hannover	
Celler Straße 30; 52.38223°N 9.73891°E	6 October 2011	Georg Koenigsberger	Hier wohnte Georg; Koenigsberger; Jg. 1876 deportiert 15.12.1941 tot in Riga	Stolperstein, Georg Koenigsberger in Hannover, Celler Straße 30 vom 09.11.2022	
Celler Straße 30; 52.38223°N 9.73891°E	6 October 2011	Rosa Koenigsberger	Hier wohnte Rosa; Koenigsberger geb. Haas; Jg. 1889 deportiert 15.12.1941 tot in Riga	Stolperstein, Rosa Koenigsberger in Hannover, Celler Straße 30 vom 09.11.2022	
Dieterichsstraße 14; 52.37215°N 9.74985°E	3 March 2009	Robert Gauweiler	Hier wohnte Robert Gauweiler; Jg. 1906 verhaftet 'Wehrkraftzersetzung' erschossen 11.12.1944	Stolperstein für Robert Gauweiler in Hannover	
Ebhardtstraße 1; 52.36895°N 9.73862°E	13 November 2008	Frieda Binheim	Hier wohnte Frieda Binheim geb. Adler; Jg. 1893 deportiert 1943 ermordet in Auschwitz		When first laid, the stones were in a different order:
Ebhardtstraße 1; 52.36895°N 9.73862°E	13 November 2008	Fritz Binheim	Hier wohnte Fritz Binheim; Jg. 1888 deportiert 1943 ermordet in Auschwitz		
Ebhardtstraße 1; 52.36895°N 9.73862°E	13 November 2008	Hans-Werner Binheim	Hier wohnte Hans-Werner; Binheim; Jg. 1923 verhaftet 1941; Mauthausen tot 18.9.1941		
Eichendorffstraße 2; 52.37625°N 9.75766°E	20 November 2015	Rosa Oppenheim	Hier wohnte Rosa Oppenheim geb. Steinitz; Jg. 1897 deportiert 15.12.1941 ermordet in Riga	Stolperstein für Rosa Oppenheim	
Eichendorffstraße 5	30 June 2026	Elisabeth Rothschild			
Eichstraße (opposite no. 2); 52.37779°N 9.75241°E	20 November 2015	Heinrich Herzberg	Hier wohnte Dr. Heinrich; Herzberg; Jg. 1888 deportiert 15.12.1941 ermordet in Riga		
Eichstraße (opposite no. 2); 52.37779°N 9.75241°E	20 November 2015	Irma Herzberg	Hier wohnte Irma Herzberg geb. Linz; Jg. 1892 deportiert 15.12.1941 ermordet in Riga		
Eichstraße (opposite no. 2); 52.37779°N 9.75241°E	20 November 2015	Ulrich Herzberg	Hier wohnte Ulrich Herzberg; Jg. 1927; Kindertransport 1938; Holland interniert Westerbork deportiert 1943; Sobibor ermordet 26.3.1943		
Ellernstraße 39; 52.37395°N 9.75851°E	7 December 2017	Lieselotte Bloch	Hier wohnte Lieselotte Bloch geb. Meyer; Jg. 1919 deportiert 1942; Ghetto Warschau ermordet	Stolperstein für Lieselotte Bloch in Hannover	
Ellernstraße 39; 52.37395°N 9.75851°E	7 December 2017	Otto Bloch	Hier wohnte Dr. Otto Bloch; Jg. 1906 deportiert 1942; Ghetto Warschau ermordet Mai 1942	Stolperstein für Otto Bloch in Hannover	
Ellernstraße 39; 52.37395°N 9.75851°E	7 December 2017	Tana Bloch	Hier wohnte Tana Bloch; Jg. 1941 deportiert 1942; Ghetto Warschau ermordet	Stolperstein für Tana Bloch in Hannover	
Erwinstraße 3; 52.37936°N 9.76318°E	18 September 2013	Esther Ernestine Berkowitz	Hier wohnte Esther Ernestine; Berkowitz geb. Schuhmacher; Jg. 1869 deportiert 23.7.1942; Theresienstadt tot 16.12.1943	Stolperstein für Esther Ernestine Berkowitz in Hannover	
Erwinstraße 3; 52.37936°N 9.76318°E	18 September 2013	Horst Egon Berkowitz	Hier wohnte Dr. Horst; Berkowitz; Jg. 1898; Berufsverbot 'Schutzhaft’ 1938; Buchenwald 'Judenkonsulent'; Ahlen überlebt	Stolperstein für Horst Berkowitz in Hannover	
Erwinstraße 3; 52.37936°N 9.76318°E	18 September 2013	Else Berkowitz	Hier wohnte Else; Berkowitz geb. Steeg; Jg. 1902 deportiert 15.12.1941 tot in Riga	Stolperstein für Else Berkowitz in Hannover	
Erwinstraße 3; 52.37936°N 9.76318°E	18 September 2013	Birgit Ruth Berkowitz	Hier wohnte Birgit Ruth; Berkowitz; Jg. 1937 deportiert 15.12.1941 tot in Riga	Stolperstein für Birgit Ruth Berkowitz in Hannover	
Erwinstraße 3; 52.37936°N 9.76318°E	18 September 2013	Gerhard Berkowitz	Hier wohnte Gerhard; Berkowitz; Jg. 1901 deportiert 15.12.1941 tot in Riga	Stolperstein für Gerhard Berkowitz in Hannover	
Erwinstraße 7; 52.37972°N 9.76366°E	18 September 2013	Elise Rheinhold	Hier wohnte Elise Rheinhold geb. Daniel; Jg. 1865 deportiert 23.7.1942; Theresienstadt tot 23.8.1943	Stolperstein für Elise Rheinhold in Hannover	
Erwinstraße 7; 52.37972°N 9.76366°E	18 September 2013	Otto Rheinhold	Hier wohnte Otto Rheinhold; Jg. 1855 gedemütigt/entrechtet tot 16.8.1937	Stolperstein für Otto Rheinhold in Hannover	
Flüggestraße 9; 52.38449°N 9.74985°E	7 December 2017	Meyer Katz	Hier wohnte Meyer Katz; Jg. 1873 deportiert 23.7.1942; Theresienstadt ermordet in Treblinka	Stolperstein, Meyer Katz in Hannover, Flüggestraße 9 vom 09.11.2022	
Flüggestraße 9; 52.38449°N 9.74985°E	7 December 2017	Olga Katz	Hier wohnte Olga Katz geb. Hurtig; Jg. 1880 deportiert 23.7.1942; Theresienstadt ermordet in Treblinka	Stolperstein, Olga Katz in Hannover, Flüggestraße 9 vom 09.11.2022	
Flüggestraße 11; 52.38490°N 9.74986°E	7 December 2017	Dora Levy	Hier wohnte Dora Levy geb. Ascher; Jg. 1884 deportiert am 15.12.1941 tot in Riga	Stolperstein, Dora Levy in Hannover, Flüggestraße 11 vom 09.11.2022	
Flüggestraße 12; 52.38505°N 9.74987°E	7 December 2017	Arthur Eichmann	Hier wohnte Arthur Eichmann; Jg. 1894; KZ Buchenwald tot 22.8.1941	Stolperstein, Arthur Eichmann in Hannover, Flüggestraße 12 vom 09.11.2022	
Flüggestraße 12; 52.38505°N 9.74987°E	7 December 2017	Selma Eichmann	Hier wohnte Selma Eichmann geb. Böhme; Jg. 1865 deportiert 23.7.1942; Theresienstadt tot 27.3.1943	Stolperstein, Selma Eichmann in Hannover, Flüggestraße 12 vom 09.11.2022	
Friedenstraße 12; 52.37823°N 9.75829°E	6 December 2007	Siegfried Sander	Hier wohnte Siegfried Sander; Jg. 1881 verhaftet 9.4.1941; Sachsenhausen tot 6.8.1941	Stolperstein für Siegfried Sander in Hannover	
Fundstraße 10; 52.383041°N 9.750460°E	25 May 2022	Max Rose	Hier wohnte Max Rose; Jg. 1878 deportiert 15.12.1941; Riga ermordet	Stolperstein, Max Rose in Hannover, Fundstraße 18 vom 09.11.2022	
Fundstraße 10; 52.383041°N 9.750460°E	25 May 2022	Sophie Rose	Hier wohnte Sophie Rose geb. Blumenfeld; Jg. 1882 deportiert 15.12.1941; Riga ermordet	Stolperstein, Sophie Rose in Hannover, Fundstraße 18 vom 09.11.2022	
Fundstraße 10; 52.383041°N 9.750460°E	25 May 2022	Isaak 'Max' Golab	Hier wohnte Isaak 'Max' Golab; Jg. 1899 deportiert 15.12.1941; Riga ermordet	Stolperstein, Isaak 'Max' Golab in Hannover, Fundstraße 18 vom 09.11.2022	
Fundstraße 10; 52.383041°N 9.750460°E	25 May 2022	Elsa Golab	Hier wohnte Elsa Golab geb. Rosenthal; Jg. 1892 deportiert 15.12.1941; Riga ermordet	Stolperstein, Elsa Golab in Hannover, Fundstraße 18 vom 09.11.2022	
Gellertstraße 3; 52.37569°N 9.75941°E	7 October 2011	Johanne Seemann	Hier wohnte Johanne Seemann geb. Schwarzschild; Jg. 1872 deportiert 23.7.1942; Theresienstadt tot 31.3.1943		
Gellertstraße 3; 52.37569°N 9.75941°E	7 October 2011	Moritz Seemann	Hier wohnte Moritz Seemann; Jg. 1866 deportiert 23.7.1942; Theresienstadt tot 25.4.1943		
Gerberstraße 6; 52.37604°N 9.72233°E	20 November 2015	Eduard Lintner	Hier wohnte Eduard Lintner; Jg. 1876 eingewiesen 1923; Heilanstalt Hildesheim 'verlegt’ 20.6.1941; Hadamar ermordet 20.5.1941 'Aktion T4'	Stolperstein für Eduard Lintner in Hannover	
Goetheplatz 4; 52.37311°N 9.72321°E	6 December 2007	Josef Pels	Hier wohnte Josef Pels; Jg. 1889 ärztliche Behandlung verweigert tot 11.2.1941	der Stolperstein für Josef Pels	
Goetheplatz 4; 52.37311°N 9.72321°E	6 December 2007	Erwin Pels	Hier wohnte Erwin Pels; Jg. 1927 deportiert 15.12.1941; Riga ermordet 10.3.1945 in KZ Kaufering	der Stolperstein für Erwin Pels	
Goetheplatz 4; 52.37311°N 9.72321°E	11 July 2019	Hertha Pels	Hier wohnte Hertha Pels geb. Levi; Jg. 1904 deportiert 15.12.1941; Riga; 1944 Stutthof befreit	der Stolperstein für Hertha Pels	The stones for Hertha and Lore Pels were at first only handed over symbolically and not laid
Goetheplatz 4; 52.37311°N 9.72321°E	11 July 2019	Lore Pels	Hier wohnte Lore Pels verh. Oppenheimer; Jg. 1926 deportiert 15.12.1941; Riga; 1944 Stutthof befreit	der Stolperstein für Lore Pels	The stones for Hertha and Lore Pels were at first only handed over symbolically and not laid
Goethestraße 19	30 June 2026	Julius Blumenfeld			
Goethestraße 19	30 June 2026	Dina Blumenfeld			
Goethestraße 36; 52.37381°N 9.72646°E	12 June 2013	Erna Brodacz	Hier wohnte Erna Brodacz geb. Katz; Jg. 1895 abgeschoben 28.10.1938; Polen; Schicksal unbekannt		
Goethestraße 36; 52.37381°N 9.72646°E	12 June 2013	Rachmil Emil Brodacz	Hier wohnte Rachmil Emil; Brodacz; Jg. 1894 abgeschoben 28.10.1938; Polen; Schicksal unbekannt		
Goethestraße 36; 52.37381°N 9.72646°E	12 June 2013	Hans-Joachim Brodacz	Hier wohnte Hans-Joachim; Brodacz; Jg. 1921 abgeschoben 28.10.1938; Polen; Schicksal unbekannt		
Goldener Winkel 2; 52.37366°N 9.73341°E	26 September 2018	Isaak Josef Klein	Hier wohnte Isaak Josef Klein; Jg. 1888; Polenaktion 1938; Bentschen/Zbaszyn ermordet in Auschwitz		
Goldener Winkel 2; 52.37366°N 9.73341°E	26 September 2018	Basia Klein	Hier wohnte Basia Klein geb. Neumann; Jg. 1898; Polenaktion 1938; Bentschen/Zbaszyn ermordet in Auschwitz		
Gretchenstraße 12; 52.383768°N 9.747553°E	27 March 2025	Adolf Moses	Hier wohnte Adolf Moses; Jg. 1890 verhaftet Juni 1938 'Aktion Arbeitsscheu Reich'; KZ Sachsenhausen; Flucht 1939; Shanghai; USA		
Gretchenstraße 24; 52.383873°N 9.751281°E	13 November 2008	Minnie Leah Ascher	Hier wohnte Minnie Leah; Ascher; Jg. 1888 deportiert 1942; Theresienstadt ermordet in Auschwitz	Stolperstein, Minnie Leah Ascher in Hannover, Gretchenstraße 24 vom 09.11.2022	
Grotefendstraße 4; 52.37547°N 9.71889°E	20 November 2015	Bernhard Bachrach	Hier wohnte Bernhard Bachrach; Jg. 1859 deportiert 23.7.1942; Theresienstadt ermordet 18.11.1942		
Grotefendstraße 4; 52.37547°N 9.71889°E	20 November 2015	Julie Bachrach	Hier wohnte Julie Bachrach geb. Herz; Jg. 1861 deportiert 23.7.1942; Theresienstadt ermordet 20.11.1943		
Grotefendstraße 4; 52.37547°N 9.71889°E	20 November 2015	Adolf Bachrach	Hier wohnte Adolf Bachrach; Jg. 1890 deportiert 15.12.1941 ermordet in Riga		
Große Packhofstraße 45; 52.37578°N 9.73833°E	18 September 2013	Julie Frenkel	Hier wohnte Julie Frenkel geb. Lütgers; Jg. 1857 deportiert 23.7.1942; Theresienstadt tot 21.5.1943	Stolperstein für Julie Frenkel in Hannover	
Hagenstraße 19; 52.38236°N 9.73562°E	7 October 2011	Heinrich Hoffmann	Hier wohnte Heinrich Hoffmann; Jg. 1891 'Schutzhaft’ 1936; 1937 Zuchthaus Hameln; 1938 Sachsenhausen tot 12.1.1940	Stolperstein für Heinrich Hoffmann in Hannover	
Hartwigstraße 5; 52.37653°N 9.72219°E	6 October 2011	Chaim Kraushaar	Hier wohnte Chaim Kraushaar; Jg. 1888 abgeschoben 28.10.1938 nach Polen ???		
Hartwigstraße 5; 52.37653°N 9.72219°E	6 October 2011	Esther Kraushaar	Hier wohnte Esther Kraushaar geb. Springer; Jg. 1901 deportiert 15.12.1941 tot in Riga		
Hartwigstraße 5; 52.37653°N 9.72219°E	6 October 2011	Max Kraushaar	Hier wohnte Max Kraushaar; Jg. 1936 abgeschoben 28.10.1938 nach Polen ???		
Hartwigstraße 5; 52.37653°N 9.72219°E	6 October 2011	Pinkas Springer	Hier wohnte Pinkas Springer; Jg. 1872 abgeschoben 28.10.1938 nach Polen ???		
Hartwigstraße 5; 52.37653°N 9.72219°E	6 October 2011	Chaje Springer	Hier wohnte Chaje Springer geb. Rosenbaum; Jg. 1870 abgeschoben 28.10.1938 nach Polen ???		
Hartwigstraße 5; 52.37653°N 9.72219°E	6 October 2011	Chaskel Springer	Hier wohnte Chaskel Springer Jg. 1900; Flucht 23.11.1938; Shanghai ???		
Hartwigstraße 5; 52.37653°N 9.72219°E	6 October 2011	Hirsch Springer	Hier wohnte Hirsch Springer; Jg. 1909 verhaftet 1938; 1939-1942 Buchenwald; Auschwitz ermordet 5.3.1943		
Heiligerstraße 16; 52.37443°N 9.73532°E	4 December 2012	Walter Krämer	Hier wohnte Walter Krämer; Jg. 1892 nach Reichstagsbrand verhaftet 28.2.1938; Zuchthaus Hameln; 1937 Buchenwald; Aussenlager bei Goslar ermordet 6.11.1941	Stolperstein für Walter Krämer in Hannover	
Heinrichstraße 22; 52.37867°N 9.75215°E	17 October 2014	Henni Hein	Hier wohnte Henni Hein geb. Seckel; Jg. 1886 gedemütigt/entrechtet Flucht in den Tod; 21.7.1939		
Heinrichstraße 22; 52.37867°N 9.75215°E	17 October 2014	Erich Hein	Hier wohnte Erich Hein; Jg. 1915; Flucht 1933; England		
Heinrichstraße 22; 52.37867°N 9.75215°E	17 October 2014	Georg Hein	Hier wohnte Georg Hein; Jg. 1919; Flucht 1934; England		
Heinrichstraße 22; 52.37867°N 9.75215°E	17 October 2014	Gertrud Hein	Hier wohnte Gertrud Hein; Jg. 1920; Flucht 1934; England		
Heinrichstraße 25; 52.37903°N 9.75280°E	13 November 2008	Henriette Gottschalk	Hier wohnte Henriette; Gottschalk geb. Rothschild; Jg. 1849 deportiert 1942; Theresienstadt tot 20.10.1942	Stolperstein für Henriette Gottschalk in Hannover	
Herschelstraße 31; 52.377841°N 9.736312°E	24 May 2023	Erich Rosenstern	Hier wohnte Erich Rosenstern; Jg. 1899 deportiert 15.12.1941; Riga ermordet 22.12.1944; Libau		
Herschelstraße 31; 52.377841°N 9.736312°E	24 May 2023	Frieda Rosenstern	Hier wohnte Frieda Rosenstern geb. Abt; Jg. 1905 deportiert 15.12.1941; Riga; 1944 Stutthof ermordet		
Herschelstraße 31; 52.377841°N 9.736312°E	24 May 2023	Ernst Rosenstern	Hier wohnte Ernst Rosenstern; Jg. 1930 deportiert 15.12.1941; Riga; 1944 Stutthof befreit		
Loebensteinstraße 34; 52.379671°N 9.761461°E	25 May 2022	Herbert Loebenstein	Hier wohnte Herbert Loebenstein; Jg. 1897; Flucht 1937 Holland interniert Westerbork deportiert 1943; Sobibor ermordet 21.5.1943		
Loebensteinstraße 34; 52.379671°N 9.761461°E	25 May 2022	Gertrud Loebenstein	Hier wohnte Gertrud Loebenstein geb. Blumenthal; Jg. 1899; Flucht 1937 Holland interniert Westerbork deportiert 1943; Sobibor ermordet 21.5.1943		
Loebensteinstraße 34; 52.379671°N 9.761461°E	25 May 2022	Lotte-Lore Loebenstein	Hier wohnte Lotte-Lore Loebenstein; Jg. 1932; Flucht 1937 Holland interniert Westerbork deportiert 1943; Sobibor ermordet 21.5.1943		
Hinüberstraße 19; 52.37490°N 9.74835°E	6 October 2014	Hilde Schneider	Hier wohnte Hilde Schneider; Jg. 1916 deportiert 15.12.1941; Riga befreit/überlebt	Stolperstein für Hilde Schneider in Hannover	
Holzmarkt 3; 52.37152°N 9.73276°E	18 September 2013	Max Moses Heinemann	Hier wohnte Max Moses; Heinemann; Jg. 1872; Flucht 1938 Holland interniert Westerbork ermordet in Auschwitz		
Holzmarkt 3; 52.37152°N 9.73276°E	18 September 2013	Rosa Heinemann	Hier wohnte Rosa Heinemann geb. Friedmann; Jg. 1875; Flucht 1938 Holland interniert Westerbork ermordet in Auschwitz		
Humboldtstraße 18; 52.37178°N 9.72319°E	13 November 2008	Ben-Zion Reiser	Hier wohnte Ben-Zion Reiser; Jg. 1903; Flucht 1935 Polen ???		
Humboldtstraße 18; 52.37178°N 9.72319°E	13 November 2008	Erna Ernestina Reiser	Hier wohnte Erna Ernestina; Reiser geb. Hirschsprung; Jg. 1897; Flucht 1935 Polen ermordet in Belzec		
Humboldtstraße 18; 52.37178°N 9.72319°E	13 November 2008	Ruth Reiser	Hier wohnte Ruth Reiser; Jg. 1931; Flucht 1935 Polen ermordet in Belzec		
Johann-Trollmann-Weg; 52.37327°N 9.73171°E	13 November 2008	Johann Trollmann	Hier wohnte Johann 'Rukelie'; Trollmann; Jg. 1907 erschlagen 1944 im KZ Aussenlager; Wittenberge		Further stones for Johann Trollmann lie outside the theater at Schulterblatt 71 in Hamburg and outside Fidicinstraße 2 in Berlin-Kreuzberg
Johann-Trollmann-Weg; 52.37327°N 9.73171°E	12 June 2013	Julius Trollmann	Hier wohnte Julius 'Mauso'; Trollmann; Jg. 1910; Arbeitserziehungslager; Lahde zum Krüppel geschlagen überlebt		
Johann-Trollmann-Weg; 52.37327°N 9.73171°E	22 March 2010	Heinrich Trollmann	Hier wohnte Heinrich; Trollmann gen. Stabeli; Jg. 1916 deportiert Auschwitz ermordet 13.11.1943		
Karl-Heinrich-Ulrichs-Straße/Rundestraße; 52.37946°N 9.74111°E	7 October 2011	Karl Schmidt	Hier wohnte Karl Schmidt; Jg. 1893 verhaftet 1941; Haftanstalt Emden tot 10.10.1941		
Karl-Heinrich-Ulrichs-Straße/Rundestraße; 52.37946°N 9.74111°E	7 October 2011	Wilhelm Röpke	Hier wohnte Wilhelm Röpke; Jg. 1891 'Schutzhaft’ 1937 verurteilt 1944; Zuchthaus Celle tot 9.3.1945		
Karmarschstraße 30/32; 52.372299°N 9.737331°E	25 May 2022	Abraham Storch	Hier wohnte Abraham Storch; Jg. 1890 'Polenaktion' 1938; Bentschen/Zbaszyn deportiert ermordet in Belzec		
Karmarschstraße 30/32; 52.372299°N 9.737331°E	25 May 2022	Bronia Storch	Hier wohnte Bronia Storch geb. Feldberg Brüh; Jg. 1897 'Polenaktion' 1938; Bentschen/Zbaszyn deportiert ermordet in Belzec		
Karmarschstraße 30/32; 52.372299°N 9.737331°E	25 May 2022	Senta Storch	Hier wohnte Senta Storch; Jg. 1926 eingewiesen 1938; Rotenburger Anstalten 'verlegt' 27.9.1940; Brandenburg ermordet 27.9.1940 'Aktion T4'		
Karmarschstraße 30/32; 52.372299°N 9.737331°E	25 May 2022	Viktor Storch	Hier wohnte Viktor Storch; Jg. 1931 'Polenaktion' 1938; Bentschen/Zbaszyn deportiert ermordet in Belzec		
Kramerstraße 4; 52.37180°N 9.73376°E	30 September 2016	Otto Kreikbaum	Hier wohnte Otto Kreikbaum; Jg. 1909 im Widerstand/KPD 'Schutzhaft' 1933; Moringen; Esterwegen; Bewährungsbataillon tot an den Folgen; Tamilow/Russland		
Kramerstraße 19/20; 52.37169°N 9.73367°E	20 November 2015	Abraham Eigermann	Hier wohnte Abraham; Eigermann; Jg. 1882 'Polenaktion' 1938; Bentschen/Zbaszyn ermordet in Belzec		
Kramerstraße 19/20; 52.37169°N 9.73367°E	20 November 2015	Feigel Esther Eigermann	Hier wohnte Feigel Esther; Eigermann geb. Klapholz; Jg. 1881 'Polenaktion' 1938; Bentschen/Zbaszyn ermordet in Belzec		
Kramerstraße 19/20; 52.37169°N 9.73367°E	20 November 2015	Chaja Klapholz	Hier wohnte Chaja Klapholz; Jg. 1874 'Polenaktion' 1938; Bentschen/Zbaszyn ermordet in Belzec		
Kramerstraße 19/20; 52.37169°N 9.73367°E	20 November 2015	Sara Lea Eigermann	Hier wohnte Sara Lea; Eigermann; Jg. 1907 'Polenaktion' 1938; Bentschen/Zbaszyn; Flucht Belgien interniert Mechelen ermordet in Auschwitz		
Kramerstraße 19/20; 52.37169°N 9.73367°E	20 November 2015	Regina Eigermann	Hier wohnte Regina; Eigermann; Jg. 1910 'Polenaktion' 1938; Bentschen/Zbaszyn ermordet in Belzec		
Kurt-Schumacher-Straße 31; 52.376556°N 9.733751°E	13 November 2008	Adolf Goldfinger	Hier wohnte Adolf Goldfinger; Jg. 1897 ausgewiesen 28.10.1938 nach Polen ???	der Stolperstein für Adolf Goldfinger	
Kurt-Schumacher-Straße 31; 52.376556°N 9.733751°E	13 November 2008	Fanny Goldfinger	Hier wohnte Fanny Goldfinger geb. Wulkan; Jg. 1899 ausgewiesen 26.6.1939 nach Polen ermordet in Auschwitz	der Stolperstein für Fanny Goldfinger	
Kurt-Schumacher-Straße 31; 52.376556°N 9.733751°E	13 November 2008	Fredi Goldfinger	Hier wohnte Fredi Goldfinger; Jg. 1929 ausgewiesen 26.6.1939 nach Polen ermordet in Auschwitz	der Stolperstein für Fredi Goldfinger	
Königstraße 5; 52.3753°N 9.7472°E	26 September 2018	Hans Dahlheim	Hier wohnte Dr. Hans; Dahlheim; Jg. 1891; Entzug der Amtszulassung; Flucht in den Tod; 18.7.1941	Stolperstein für Dr. Hans Dahlheim in Hannover	
Königstraße 5; 52.3753°N 9.7472°E	26 September 2018	Ida Dahlheim	Hier wohnte Ida Dahlheim geb. Mannheim; Jg. 1865 deportiert 23.7.1942; Theresienstadt ermordet 17.5.1944	Stolperstein für Ida Dahlheim in Hannover	
Königstraße 50a 52.375966°N 9.748035°E	6 October 2014	Adolf Badt	Hier wohnte Dr. Adolf Badt; Jg. 1864 deportiert 23.7.1942; Theresienstadt ermordet 3.3.1943	Stolperstein für Adolf Badt in Hannover	
Königstraße 50a 52.375966°N 9.748035°E	6 October 2014	Clementine Badt	Hier wohnte Clementine Badt geb. Belmont; Jg. 1879 deportiert 23.7.1942; Theresienstadt; 1944 Auschwitz ermordet	Stolperstein für Clementine Badt in Hannover	
Königstraße 50a 52.375966°N 9.748035°E	6 October 2014	Emil Badt	Hier wohnte Emil Badt; Jg. 1899; Patient in Jacoby’sche Anstalt; Bendorf-Sayn Koblenz deportiert 1942; Sobibor ermordet	Stolperstein für Emil Badt in Hannover	
Königstraße 50a 52.375966°N 9.748035°E	6 October 2014	Carl Salomon	Hier wohnte Dr. Carl Salomon; Jg. 1881; Entzug der Bestallung unfreiwillig verzogen 1939 München deportiert 1942; Piaski ermordet	Stolperstein für Carl Salomon in Hannover	
Königstraße 50a 52.375966°N 9.748035°E	6 October 2014	Käthe Salomon	Hier wohnte Käthe Salomon; Jg. 1897 geb. Molling unfreiwillig verzogen 1939 München deportiert 1942; Piaski ermordet	Stolperstein für Käthe Salomon in Hannover	
Königsworther Straße 10; 52.37693°N 9.72139°E	26 September 2018	Josef Kirchheimer	Hier wohnte Josef Kirchheimer; Jg. 1883 deportiert 15.12.1941 ermordet in Riga		
Königsworther Straße 10; 52.37693°N 9.72139°E	26 September 2018	Hedwig Kirchheimer	Hier wohnte Hedwig Kirchheimer geb. Heller; Jg. 1883 deportiert 15.12.1941 ermordet in Riga		
Lange Laube 1; 52.37585°N 9.73126°E	12 November 2013	Bernhard Maissner	Hier wohnte Bernhard Maissner; Jg. 1877 'Polenaktion' 1939 ermordet im besetzten Polen		
Lange Laube 1; 52.37585°N 9.73126°E	12 November 2013	Isaac Maissner	Hier wohnte Isaac Maissner; Jg. 1905; Flucht 1934; Palästina überlebt		
Lange Laube 1; 52.37585°N 9.73126°E	12 November 2013	Isidor Maissner	Hier wohnte Isidor Maissner; Jg. 1913; Flucht 1938; Australien überlebt		
Lange Laube 1; 52.37585°N 9.73126°E	12 November 2013	Regina Rivka Maissner	Hier wohnte Regina Rivka; Maissner geb. Richter; Jg. 1877; Flucht 1939; Palästina überlebt		
Lange Laube 1; 52.37585°N 9.73126°E	12 November 2013	Rosa Maissner	Hier wohnte Rosa Maissner; Jg. 1912; Flucht 1939; Palästina; Südafrika überlebt		
Lange Laube 6; 52.37624°N 9.73095°E	18 September 2013	Lucie Warschauer	Hier wohnte Lucie Warschauer geb. Meyer; Jg. 1893 verhaftet Ravensbrück 'verlegt’ 1942; Bernburg ermordet 1942		
Lange Laube 6; 52.37624°N 9.73095°E	18 September 2013	Otto Warschauer	Hier wohnte Dr. Otto; Warschauer; Jg. 1885 deportiert 15.12.1941 tot in Riga		
Lange Laube 18; 52.37670°N 9.72906°E	3 March 2009	Fritz Frensdorff	Hier wohnte Dr. Fritz; Frensdorff; Jg. 1889; Flucht in den Tod; 12.2.1938	Stolperstein für Fritz Frensdorff in Hannover	
Lavesstraße 64; 52.37294°N 9.75019°E	26 September 2018	Elisabeth Müller	Hier wohnte Dr. Elisabeth Müller; Jg. 1895; Berufsverbot 1933; Flucht 1933 Schweiz heimgekehrt 1939 deportiert 23.7.1942; Theresienstadt ermordet in Auschwitz	Stolperstein für Elisabeth Müller in Hannover	
Leibnizufer/Clemensstraße; 52.37299°N 9.72870°E	13 November 2008	Samuel Chmielewski	Hier wohnte Samuel; Chmielewski; Jg. 1896 ausgewiesen 28.10.1938 nach Polen ???		
Leibnizufer/Clemensstraße; 52.37299°N 9.72870°E	13 November 2008	Paula Chmielewski	Hier wohnte Paula; Chmielewski; Jg. 1927 ausgewiesen 28.10.1938 nach Polen ???		
Leibnizufer/Clemensstraße; 52.37299°N 9.72870°E	13 November 2008	Chana Chmielewski	Hier wohnte Chana; Chmielewski geb. Tondowski; Jg. 1896 ausgewiesen 28.10.1938 nach Polen ???		
Leibnizufer/Clemensstraße; 52.37299°N 9.72870°E	6 October 2011	Chana Kraushaar	Hier wohnte Chana Kraushaar geb. Storch; Jg. 1884 abgeschoben 28.10.1938 nach Polen ???		
Leibnizufer/Clemensstraße; 52.37299°N 9.72870°E	6 October 2011	Klara Kraushaar	Hier wohnte Klara Kraushaar; Jg. 1913 tot in Polen		
Leibnizufer/Clemensstraße; 52.37299°N 9.72870°E	6 October 2011	Erna Kraushaar	Hier wohnte Erna Kraushaar; Jg. 1920; Flucht 1938; Palästina überlebt		
Leisewitzstraße 41; 52.37396°N 9.75495°E	6 October 2014	Hermann Hirschfeld	Hier wohnte Hermann; Hirschfeld; Jg. 1871 deportiert 15.12.1941; Riga ermordet 1943		
Leisewitzstraße 41; 52.37396°N 9.75495°E	6 October 2014	Selma Hirschfeld	Hier wohnte Selma Hirschfeld geb. Nachmann; Jg. 1890 deportiert 15.12.1941; Riga ermordet 1942		
Lenaustraße 11; 52.37212°N 9.72201°E	20 November 2015	Margarete Scheele	Hier wohnte Margarete Scheele geb. Samuel; Jg. 1890 deportiert 23.7.1942; Theresienstadt befreit	Stolperstein für Margarete Schelle in Hannover	
Ludwig-Barnay-Straße 11	30 June 2026	Julius Gumpel			
Marktstraße	30 June 2026	Abraham Flieder			
Marktstraße	30 June 2026	Ruchla Flieder			
Marktstraße	30 June 2026	Chin Flieder			
Marktstraße	30 June 2026	Isaak Flieder			
Mittelstraße, opposite nos. 10/11; 52.369491°N 9.727410°E	6 December 2007	Berta Blum	Hier wohnte Berta Blum geb. Rosenbach gesch. Braun; Jg. 1902 deportiert 2.3.1943; Auschwitz tot 10.6.1944		
Mittelstraße, opposite nos. 10/11; 52.369491°N 9.727410°E	6 December 2007	Günter Braun	Hier wohnte Günter Braun; Jg. 1933 deportiert 2.3.1943 tot in Auschwitz		
Mittelstraße, opposite nos. 10/11; 52.369491°N 9.727410°E	6 December 2007	Brigitta Braun	Hier wohnte Brigitta Braun; Jg. 1934 deportiert 2.3.1943; Auschwitz tot 24.3.1944		
Mittelstraße, opposite nos. 10/11; 52.369491°N 9.727410°E	6 December 2007	Elsa-Vera Braun	Hier wohnte Elsa-Vera Braun; Jg. 1935 deportiert 2.3.1943; Auschwitz tot 11.2.1944		
Mittelstraße, opposite nos. 10/11; 52.369491°N 9.727410°E	6 December 2007	Hedwig Rosenbach	Hier wohnte Hedwig Rosenbach; Jg. 1936 deportiert 2.3.1943; Auschwitz tot 20.3.1944		
Mittelstraße, opposite nos. 10/11; 52.369491°N 9.727410°E	6 December 2007	Paul Blum	Hier wohnte Paul Blum; Jg. 1937 deportiert 2.3.1943 tot in Auschwitz		
Mittelstraße, opposite nos. 10/11; 52.369491°N 9.727410°E	6 December 2007	Berno Blum	Hier wohnte Berno Blum; Jg. 1939 deportiert 2.3.1943 tot in Auschwitz		
Mittelstraße, opposite nos. 10/11; 52.369491°N 9.727410°E	6 December 2007	Rosemarie Blum	Hier wohnte Rosemarie Blum; Jg. 1940 deportiert 2.3.1943 tot in Auschwitz		
Odeonstraße 4; 52.37763°N 9.73442°E	6 October 2011	Ida Plaut	Hier wohnte Ida Plaut geb. Doernberg; Jg. 1878 deportiert 15.12.1941 tot in Riga	Stolperstein für Ida Plaut in Hannover	
Ohestraße 6; 52.36664°N 9.72484°E	12 November 2013	Anna Alter	Hier wohnte Anna Alter geb. Brenner; Jg. 1901; Flucht 1935; Südafrika überlebt		
Ohestraße 6; 52.36664°N 9.72484°E	12 November 2013	Eleasar Alter	Hier wohnte Eleasar Alter; Jg. 1923; Flucht 1935; Südafrika überlebt		
Ohestraße 6; 52.36664°N 9.72484°E	12 November 2013	Israel Alter	Hier wohnte Israel Alter; Jg. 1901; Flucht 1935; Südafrika überlebt		
Ohestraße 6; 52.36664°N 9.72484°E	12 November 2013	Klara Alter	Hier wohnte Klara Alter; Jg. 1926; Flucht 1935; Südafrika überlebt		
Ohestraße 6; 52.36664°N 9.72484°E	12 November 2013	Reginna Brenner	Hier wohnte Regina Brenner; Jg. 1912; Flucht 1935; Südafrika überlebt		
Ohestraße 6; 52.36664°N 9.72484°E	12 November 2013	David Sobel-Brenner	Hier wohnte David; Sobel-Brenner; Jg. 1907; Flucht 1933; Palästina überlebt		
Ohestraße 6; 52.36664°N 9.72484°E	12 November 2013	Hermann Hersch Sobel-Brenner	Hier wohnte Hermann Hersch; Sobel-Brenner; Jg. 1903; Flucht 1935; Südafrika überlebt		
Osterstraße 20; 52.372536°N 9.738058°E	27 March 2025	Adelheid Salfeld	Hier wohnte Adelheid Salfeld; Jg. 1909 deportiert 31.3.1942; Ghetto Warschau ermordet		
Osterstraße 20; 52.372536°N 9.738058°E	27 March 2025	Ida Salfeld	Hier wohnte Ida Salfeld geb. Simon; Jg. 1883 deportiert 31.3.1942; Ghetto Warschau ermordet		
Osterstraße 39; 52.37089°N 9.73875°E	3 March 2009	Bernhard Seeger	Hier wohnte Bernhard Seeger; Jg. 1906 verhaftet 2.3.1943 deportiert ermordet in Auschwitz		
Osterstraße 39; 52.37089°N 9.73875°E	3 March 2009	Martha Seeger	Hier wohnte Martha Seeger geb. Emmler; Jg. 1904 verhaftet 2.3.1943 deportiert ermordet in Auschwitz		
Osterstraße 39; 52.37089°N 9.73875°E	3 March 2009	Christel Seeger	Hier wohnte Christel Seeger; Jg. 1928 verhaftet 2.3.1943 deportiert ermordet in Auschwitz		
Osterstraße 39; 52.37089°N 9.73875°E	3 March 2009	Ronald Seeger	Hier wohnte Ronald Seeger; Jg. 1934 verhaftet 2.3.1943 deportiert ermordet in Auschwitz		
Osterstraße 39; 52.37089°N 9.73875°E	3 March 2009	Melanie Seeger	Hier wohnte Melanie Seeger; Jg. 1935 verhaftet 2.3.1943 deportiert ermordet in Auschwitz		
Osterstraße 39; 52.37089°N 9.73875°E	3 March 2009	Dorothee Seeger	Hier wohnte Dorothee Seeger; Jg. 1938 verhaftet 2.3.1943 deportiert ermordet in Auschwitz		
Osterstraße 39; 52.37089°N 9.73875°E	3 March 2009	Hildegard Seeger	Hier wohnte Hildegard Seeger; Jg. 1938 verhaftet 2.3.1943 deportiert ermordet in Auschwitz		
Postkamp 18; 52.38031°N 9.72889°E	20 November 2015	Bertha Bachrach	Hier wohnte Bertha Bachrach geb. Lewin; Jg. 1892 ermordet 15.12.1941 tot in Riga	Stolperstein für Bertha Bachrach in Hannover	
Postkamp 18; 52.38031°N 9.72889°E	20 November 2015	Rudolf Bachrach	Hier wohnte Rudolf Bachrach; Jg. 1891 deportiert 15.12.1941 ermordet in Riga	Stolperstein für Rudolf Bachrach in Hannover	
Raiffeisenstraße/Bronsartstraße; 52.385509°N 9.736031°E	11 July 2019	Sophie Küchemann	Hier wohnte Sophie Küchemann; Geb. Löwenstein; Jg. 1858 deportiert 23.7.1942; Theresienstadt ermordet 6.12.1942	Stolperstein für Sophie Küchemann in Hannover	
Röselerstraße 5/7; 52.37104°N 9.73803°E	4 December 2012	Albert Fischer	Hier wohnte Albert 'Dänemann'; Fischer; Jg. 1897 verhaftet 2.3.1943 deportiert Auschwitz; Buchenwald/Dora; Bergen-Belsen befreit/überlebt		
Röselerstraße 5/7; 52.37104°N 9.73803°E	4 December 2012	Albert Fischer	Hier wohnte Albert 'Schlimmi'; Fischer; Jg. 1921 verhaftet 2.3.1943 deportiert Auschwitz befreit/überlebt		
Röselerstraße 5/7; 52.37104°N 9.73803°E	4 December 2012	Anna Fischer	Hier wohnte Anna Fischer; Jg. 1926 verhaftet 2.3.1943 deportiert ermordet in Auschwitz		
Röselerstraße 5/7; 52.37104°N 9.73803°E	4 December 2012	Antonia Fischer	Hier wohnte Antonia Fischer; Jg. 1933 verhaftet 2.3.1943 deportiert ermordet in Auschwitz		
Röselerstraße 5/7; 52.37104°N 9.73803°E	4 December 2012	Dina Fischer	Hier wohnte Dina Fischer; Jg. 1937 verhaftet 2.3.1943 deportiert Auschwitz; Opfer von Menschenversuchen tot 28.11.1943		
Röselerstraße 5/7; 52.37104°N 9.73803°E	4 December 2012	Frieda Fischer	Hier wohnte Frieda Fischer; Jg. 1932 verhaftet deportiert 2.3.1943; Auschwitz ermordet 9.3.1944		
Röselerstraße 5/7; 52.37104°N 9.73803°E	4 December 2012	Gisela Fischer	Hier wohnte Gisela Fischer; Jg. 1939 verhaftet 2.3.1943 deportiert Auschwitz; Opfer von Menschenversuchen tot 21.7.1943		
Röselerstraße 5/7; 52.37104°N 9.73803°E	4 December 2012	Henny Fischer	Hier wohnte Henny 'Trauba'; Fischer geb. Fischer; Jg. 1900 verhaftet 2.3.1943 deportiert ermordet in Auschwitz		
Röselerstraße 5/7; 52.37104°N 9.73803°E	4 December 2012	Johanna Fischer	Hier wohnte Johanna 'Karla'; Fischer; Jg. 1928 verhaftet 2.3.1943 deportiert Auschwitz; Ravensbrück; Bergen-Belsen befreit/überlebt		
Röselerstraße 5/7; 52.37104°N 9.73803°E	4 December 2012	Malla Fischer	Hier wohnte Malla Fischer; Jg. 1935 verhaftet 2.3.1943 deportiert ermordet in Auschwitz		
Röselerstraße 5/7; 52.37104°N 9.73803°E	4 December 2012	Pauline Fischer	Hier wohnte Pauline Fischer geb. Schmidt; Jg. 1875 deportiert ermordet in Auschwitz		
Röselerstraße 5/7; 52.37104°N 9.73803°E	4 December 2012	Rosa Fischer	Hier wohnte Rosa 'Kesche'; Fischer; Jg. 1925 verhaftet 2.3.1943 deportiert Auschwitz; Ravensbrück; Bergen-Belsen befreit/überlebt		
Röselerstraße 5/7; 52.37104°N 9.73803°E	4 December 2012	Wanda Fischer	Hier wohnte Wanda 'Munza'; Fischer; Jg. 1923 verhaftet 2.3.1943 deportiert Auschwitz; Ravensbrück; Bergen-Belsen befreit/überlebt		
Röselerstraße 5/7; 52.37104°N 9.73803°E	4 December 2012	Werner Fischer	Hier wohnte Werner Fischer; Jg. 1942 verhaftet 2.3.1943 deportiert verhungert in Auschwitz		
Sedanstraße 35; 52.383307°N 9.746638°E	24 May 2023	Emil Rosenstern	Hier wohnte Emil Rosenstern; Jg. 1867 deportiert 23.7.1942; Theresienstadt; Treblinka ermordet		
Sedanstraße 35; 52.383307°N 9.746638°E	24 May 2023	Helene Rosenstern	Hier wohnte Helene Rosenstern geb. Lebenbaum; Jg. 1867 deportiert 23.7.1942; Theresienstadt; Treblinka ermordet		
Seelhorststraße 48; 52.37768°N 9.76084°E	6 December 2007	Willy Gebel	Hier wohnte Willy Gebel; Jg. 1903 verhaftet 1942; Zuchthaus Brandenburg hingerichtet 30.5.1944	Stolperstein für Willy Gebel in Hannover	
Seumestraße 1a 52.384434°N 9.747072°E	25 May 2022	Fritz Lohmeyer	Hier wohnte Fritz Lohmeyer; Jg. 1890 im Widerstand/Sozialist verhaftet 19.2.1936 verurteilt 28.10.1937; Zuchthaus Hameln; 1941 Sachsenhausen; 1945 Mauthausen ermordet		
Striehlstraße 18d 52.38129°N 9.73194°E	6 December 2007	Kurt Rampoldt	Hier wohnte Kurt Rampoldt; Jg. 1902 verhaftet Sept. 1940; Sachsenhausen ermordet 2.7.1941	Stolperstein für Kurt Rampoldt in Hannover	
Volgersweg 14; 52.37870°N 9.74959°E	12 June 2013	Frieda Edelstein	Hier wohnte Frieda Edelstein geb. Nussbaum; Jg. 1875 deportiert 15.12.1941 tot in Riga		
Volgersweg 14; 52.37870°N 9.74959°E	12 June 2013	Siegmund Edelstein	Hier wohnte Siegmund; Edelstein; Jg. 1870 deportiert 15.12.1941 tot in Riga		
Wedekindstraße 3; 52.38541°N 9.74855°E	7 December 2017	Otto Stern	Hier wohnte Otto Stern; Jg. 1890 deportiert 15.12.1941 ermordet in Riga	Stolperstein, Otto Stern in Hannover, Wedekindstraße 3 vom 09.11.2022	
Wielandstraße 2; 52.370658°N 9.722461°E	13 May 2025	Elisabeth Spier	Hier wohnte Elisabeth Spier; Jg. 1930; Flucht 1939; Ecuador; USA		
Wielandstraße 2; 52.370658°N 9.722461°E	13 May 2025	Hannah Spier	Hier wohnte Hannah Spier; Jg. 1934; Flucht 1939; Ecuador; USA		
Wielandstraße 2; 52.370658°N 9.722461°E	13 May 2025	Ruth Spier	Hier wohnte Ruth Spier geb. Steinberg; Jg. 1903; Flucht 1939; Ecuador; USA		
Yorckstraße 10; 52.38198°N 9.75516°E	30 September 2016	Alfred Wechsler	Hier wohnte Alfred Wechsler; Jg. 1849 deportiert 23.7.1942; Theresienstadt ermordet 2.8.1942		
Yorckstraße 10; 52.38198°N 9.75516°E	30 September 2016	Toni Wechsler	Hier wohnte Toni Wechsler geb. Ehrlich verw. Abraham; Jg. 1868 gedemütigt/entrechtet tot 1.7.1940		

=== Nord ===
Address	Date laid	Person	Inscription	Image
Am Kleinen Felde 35; 52.386896°N 9.721922°E	24 May 2023	Kurt-Heinz Meyer	Hier wohnte Kurt-Heinz Meyer; Jg. 1921 deportiert 15.12.1941; Riga; 1944 Stutthof; 1944 Buchenwald ermordet	
Am Kleinen Felde 35; 52.386896°N 9.721922°E	24 May 2023	Marta Meyer	Hier wohnte Marta Meyer geb. Rosner; Jg. 1897; Riga; 1944 Stutthof ermordet 2.12.1944	
An der Strangriede 2; 52.39060°N 9.72037°E	6 December 2007	Walter Ackermann	Hier wohnte Walter Ackermann; Jg. 1886 verhaftet Nov. 1938; Sachsenhausen tot 30.6.1941	
Callinstraße 2; 52.38622°N 9.71779°E	26 September 2018	Iko Tennenbaum	Hier wohnte Iko Tennenbaum; Jg. 1878 deportiert 15.12.1941 ermordet in Riga	Stolperstein für Iko Tennenbaum in Hannover
Callinstraße 2; 52.38622°N 9.71779°E	26 September 2018	Sofie Tennenbaum	Hier wohnte Sofie Tennenbaum geb. London; Jg. 1884 deportiert 15.12.1941 ermordet in Riga	Stolperstein für Sofie Tennenbaum in Hannover
Engelbosteler Damm 2-2a 52.38719°N 9.72339°E	6 December 2007	Rolf Becher	Hier wohnte Rolf Becher; Jg. 1912 deportiert 15.12.1941; Riga gehenkt 18.3.1942	
Engelbosteler Damm 2-2a 52.38719°N 9.72339°E	6 December 2007	Rosa Becher	Hier wohnte Rosa Becher geb. Mendel; Jg. 1883 deportiert 15.12.1941; Riga tot Juli 1944	
Engelbosteler Damm 2-2a 52.38719°N 9.72339°E	6 December 2007	Jochen Becher	Hier wohnte Jochen Becher; Jg. 1923 deportiert 15.12.1941; Riga erfroren 20.3.1942; Salaspils	
Engelbosteler Damm 2-2a 52.38719°N 9.72339°E	4 December 2012	Klaus Becher	Hier wohnte Klaus Becher; Jg. 1926 deportiert 15.12.1941; Riga befreit/überlebt	
Kopernikusstraße 1; 52.3875°N 9.7235°E	26 September 2018	Alice Werblowski	Hier arbeitete Alice; Werblowski geb. Wolff; Berliner Warenhaus 'arisiert’ 1938; Flucht 1939; England	
Kopernikusstraße 1; 52.3875°N 9.7235°E	26 September 2018	Hermann Werblowski	Hier arbeitete Hermann; Werblowski; Jg. 1889; Berliner Warenhaus 'arisiert’ 1938; Flucht 1939; England	
Windthorststraße 1; 52.38441°N 9.72848°E	18 September 2013	Bertha Hunnemann	Hier wohnte Bertha Hunnemann geb. Heinemann; Jg. 1879 deportiert 15.12.1941 tot in Riga	
Windthorststraße 1; 52.38441°N 9.72848°E	18 September 2013	Clara Löhr	Hier wohnte Clara Löhr geb. Heinemann; Jg. 1889 deportiert 23.7.1942; Theresienstadt befreit/überlebt	
Windthorststraße 1; 52.38441°N 9.72848°E	18 September 2013	Jenny Heinemann	Hier wohnte Jenny Heinemann; Jg. 1876 deportiert 23.7.1942; Theresienstadt tot 12.10.1942	

=== Ricklingen ===
Address	Date laid	Person	Inscription	Image
Grünlinde 16; 52.33704°N 9.71340°E	7 December 2017	Fritz Treu	Hier wohnte Fritz Treu; Jg. 1904 im Widerstand; Linkssozialist deportiert 20.2.1945; Theresienstadt befreit	Stolperstein für Fritz Treu in Hannover
Grünlinde 16; 52.33704°N 9.71340°E	7 December 2017	Ilse Treu	Hier wohnte Ilse Treu geb. Rohrer; Jg. 1913 im Widerstand; Linkssozialistin mit Hilfe überlebt	Stolperstein für Fritz Ilse in Hannover

=== Südstadt-Bult ===
Address	Date laid	Person	Inscription	Image
Aegidiendamm 8; 52.36707°N 9.74335°E	30 September 2016	Doba Topf	Hier wohnte Doba ‘Doris‘ Topf; Jg. 1919 'Polenaktion' 1938; Bentschen/Zbaszyn ermordet in Auschwitz	Stolperstein für Doba Topf in Hannover
Aegidiendamm 8; 52.36707°N 9.74335°E	30 September 2016	Huna Topf	Hier wohnte Huna ‘Henry‘ Topf; Jg. 1885 'Polenaktion' 1938; Bentschen/Zbaszyn mit Hilfe überlebt	Stolperstein für Hund Topf in Hannover
Aegidiendamm 8; 52.36707°N 9.74335°E	30 September 2016	Isaak Topf	Hier wohnte Isaak ‘Julius‘ Topf; Jg. 1927 'Polenaktion' 1938; Bentschen/Zbaszyn ermordet in Auschwitz	Stolperstein für Isaak Topf in Hannover
Aegidiendamm 8; 52.36707°N 9.74335°E	30 September 2016	Marjam Topf	Hier wohnte Marjam Topf; Jg. 1898 'Polenaktion' 1938; Bentschen/Zbaszyn ermordet in Auschwitz	Stolperstein für Marjam Topf in Hannover
Aegidiendamm 8; 52.36707°N 9.74335°E	30 September 2016	Szejma Topf	Hier wohnte Szejma ‘Sonja‘ Topf; Jg. 1923 'Polenaktion' 1938; Bentschen/Zbaszyn ermordet in Auschwitz	Stolperstein für Szejma Topf in Hannover
Alte Döhrener Straße 27; 52.358190°N 9.749030°E	4 December 2012	Adam Sewenig	Hier wohnte Adam Sewenig; Jg. 1897; Zeuge Jehovas; Folter in Polizeihaft 1936 eingewiesen 26.4.1941; Heilanstalt Wunstorf 'verlegt' 1.8.1941; Heilanstalt Eichberg ermordet 3.4.1942	der Stolperstein für Adam Sewenig
Bandelstraße 7; 52.36099°N 9.75103°E	26 September 2018	Clara Dahlheim	Hier wohnte Clara Dahlheim geb. Blankenberg; Jg. 1878 deportiert 15.12.1941 ermordet in Riga	Stolperstein für Clara Dahlheim in Hannover
Bandelstraße 7; 52.36099°N 9.75103°E	26 September 2018	Hugo Dahlheim	Hier wohnte Hugo Dahlheim; Jg. 1880 deportiert 15.12.1941; Riga; 1944 Stutthof; 1944 Buchenwald ermordet 30.1.1945; Aussenlager Tröglitz	Stolperstein für Hugo Dahlheim in Hannover
Große Barlinge 4; 52.36881°N 9.75093°E	30 September 2016	Wilhelm Weber	Hier wohnte Wilhelm Weber; Jg. 1883 verhaftet 1943 'Wehrkraftzersetzung' und 'Feindbegünstigung'; Todesurteil 15.9.1943 hingerichtet 21.9.1943; Berlin-Plötzensee	Stolperstein für Wilhelm Weber in Hannover
Heinrich-Heine-Straße 4; 52.356244°N 9.754996°E	23 April 2025	Kurt Schumacher	Hier wohnte Kurt Schumacher; Jg. 1895 im Widerstand/SPD verhaftet 6.7.1933; KZ Dachau; KZ Flossenbürg entlassen 16.3.1943; 1944 KZ Neuengamme entlassen 20.9.1944	
Heinrich-Stamme-Straße 3; 52.36683°N 9.75819°E	11 July 2019	Dagobert Meyer	Hier wohnte Dagobert ‘David‘ Meyer; Jg. 1864; Flucht 1938; Südafrika	
Heinrich-Stamme-Straße 3; 52.36683°N 9.75819°E	11 July 2019	Erwin Meyer	Hier wohnte Erwin Meyer; Jg. 1911; Flucht 1935; Südafrika	
Heinrich-Stamme-Straße 3; 52.36683°N 9.75819°E	11 July 2019	Minna Meyer	Hier wohnte Minna Meyer geb. Thalheimer; Jg. 1877; Flucht 1938; Südafrika	
Hildesheimer Straße 89; 52.359451°N 9.751287°E	27 March 2025	Jenny Graefe	Hier wohnte Jenny Graefe geb. Freymuth; Jg. 1881 deportiert 31.3.1942; Ghetto Warschau ermordet	
Hildesheimer Straße 89; 52.359451°N 9.751287°E	27 March 2025	Edith Heinrich	Hier wohnte Edith Heinrich geb. Freymuth; Jg. 1887 deportiert 23.7.1942; Theresienstadt befreit	
Krausenstraße 39	30 June 2026	Elfriede Grotefend		
Rehbergstraße 1; 52.35978°N 9.75594°E	26 September 2018	Gertrud Dahlheim	Hier wohnte Gertrud Dahlheim; Jg. 1884 deportiert 15.12.1941 ermordet in Riga	Stolperstein für Gertrud Dahlheim in Hannover
Rehbergstraße 1; 52.35978°N 9.75594°E	26 September 2018	Paula Dahlheim	Hier wohnte Paula Dahlheim; Jg. 1882 deportiert 15.12.1941 ermordet in Riga	Stolperstein für Paula Dahlheim in Hannover
Rehbergstraße 1; 52.35978°N 9.75594°E	26 September 2018	Meta Zacharias	Hier wohnte Meta Zacharias geb. Dahlheim; Jg. 1876 deportiert 15.12.1941 ermordet in Riga	Stolperstein für Meta Zacharias in Hannover
Simrockstraße 9; 52.36229°N 9.75728°E	7 October 2011	Fanny Bloch	Hier wohnte Fanny Bloch geb. Rosenblum; Jg. 1872 deportiert 15.12.1941 tot in Riga	Stolperstein für Fanny Bloch in Hannover
Simrockstraße 9; 52.36229°N 9.75728°E	7 October 2011	Eva Ruth Jacobs	Hier wohnte Eva Ruth Jacobs; Jg. 1927 deportiert 15.12.1941; Riga tot in Stutthof	Stolperstein für Eva Ruth Jacobs in Hannover
Simrockstraße 9; 52.36229°N 9.75728°E	7 October 2011	Lucie Jacobs	Hier wohnte Lucie Jacobs geb. Bloch; Jg. 1901 deportiert 15.12.1941; Riga tot in Stutthof	Stolperstein für Lucie Jacobs in Hannover
Simrockstraße 9; 52.36229°N 9.75728°E	7 October 2011	Siegfried Jacobs	Hier wohnte Siegfried Jacobs; Jg. 1898; Flucht 1939; Belgien deportiert ermordet in Auschwitz	Stolperstein für Siegfried Jacobs in Hannover
Simrockstraße 9; 52.36229°N 9.75728°E	7 October 2011	Ursula Helene Jacobs	Hier wohnte Ursula Helene; Jacobs; Jg. 1925 deportiert 15.12.1941; Riga tot in Stutthof	Stolperstein für Ursula Helene Jacobs in Hannover
Stolzestraße 52	30 June 2026	Hendrik Prins		
Stüvestraße 16; 52.36010°N 9.75704°E	6 December 2007	Fränze Landsberg	Hier wohnte Fränze Landsberg geb. Wolfstein; Jg. 1896 deportiert 15.12.1941; Riga tot in Stutthof	Stolperstein für Fränze Landsberg in Hannover
Stüvestraße 16; 52.36010°N 9.75704°E	6 December 2007	Ludwig Landsberg	Hier wohnte Ludwig Landsberg; Jg. 1893 deportiert 15.12.1941; Riga tot 19.12.1944 in Dachau	Stolperstein für Ludwig Landsberg in Hannover
Torstraße 15; 52.35904°N 9.74515°E	7 October 2011	Walter Bitterlich	Hier wohnte Walter Bitterlich; Jg. 1899 'Schutzhaft’ 1934; 1944 Polizeigefängnis; Hannover; Neuengamme; Buchenwald tot 6.4.1945	Stolperstein für Walter Bitterlich in Hannover
Walter-Gieseking-Straße 32; 52.37102°N 9.75393°E	6 December 2007	Herbert Kenneweg	Hier wohnte Dr. Herbert; Kenneweg; Jg. 1909; Flucht in den Tod; 11.11.1941	Stolperstein für Herbert Kenneweg in Hannover
Wißmannstraße 11; 52.35971°N 9.76382°E	20 October 2010	Irma Ascher	Hier wohnte Irma Ascher; Jg. 1901 deportiert 15.12.1941 tot in Riga	Stolperstein für Irma Ascher in Hannover
Wißmannstraße 11; 52.35971°N 9.76382°E	20 October 2010	Johanne Ascher	Hier wohnte Johanne Ascher geb. Stein; Jg. 1872 deportiert 15.12.1941 tot in Riga	Stolperstein für Johanne Ascher in Hannover
Wißmannstraße 11; 52.35971°N 9.76382°E	20 October 2010	Martha Gumpert	Hier wohnte Martha Gumpert geb. Schiff; Jg. 1864 deportiert 23.7.1942; Theresienstadt ermordet in Treblinka	Stolperstein für Martha Gumpert in Hannover
Wißmannstraße 11; 52.35971°N 9.76382°E	20 October 2010	Hermann Heinemann	Hier wohnte Hermann Heinemann; Jg. 1900 deportiert 31.3.1942; Ghetto Warschau ???	Stolperstein für Hermann Heinemann in Hannover
Wißmannstraße 11; 52.35971°N 9.76382°E	20 October 2010	Marta Herzberg	Hier wohnte Marta Herzberg geb. Examus; Jg. 1875 deportiert 15.12.1941 tot in Riga	Stolperstein für Marta Herzberg in Hannover
Wißmannstraße 11; 52.35971°N 9.76382°E	20 October 2010	Heinz Israel	Hier wohnte Heinz Israel; Jg. 1917 deportiert 31.3.1942; Ghetto Warschau ???	Stolperstein für Heinz Israel in Hannover
Wißmannstraße 11; 52.35971°N 9.76382°E	20 October 2010	Dorothea Jacobsohn	Hier wohnte Dorothea Jacobsohn; Jg. 1903 deportiert 15.12.1941 tot in Riga	Stolperstein für Dorothea Jacobsohn in Hannover
Wißmannstraße 11; 52.35971°N 9.76382°E	20 October 2010	Erich Kleeberg	Hier wohnte Erich Kleeberg; Jg. 1902 verhaftet 1944; Gestapokeller Ahlem; KZ Sandbostel tot 1945; Haftfolgen	Stolperstein für Erich Kleeberg in Hannover
Wißmannstraße 11; 52.35971°N 9.76382°E	20 October 2010	Frieda Kleeberg	Hier wohnte Frieda Kleeberg geb. Weißenklee; Jg. 1871 deportiert 15.12.1941 tot in Riga	Stolperstein für Frieda Kleeberg in Hannover
Wißmannstraße 11; 52.35971°N 9.76382°E	20 October 2010	Hermann Kleeberg	Hier wohnte Hermann Kleeberg; Jg. 1873 deportiert 15.12.1941 tot in Riga	Stolperstein für Hermann Kleeberg in Hannover
Wißmannstraße 11; 52.35971°N 9.76382°E	20 October 2010	Maria Kleeberg	Hier wohnte Maria Kleeberg geb. Beck; Jg. 1901 gedemütigt/entrechtet Gestapo-Vorladungen 'Judenhaus’ Ahlem überlebt	Stolperstein für Maria Kleeberg in Hannover
Wißmannstraße 11; 52.35971°N 9.76382°E	20 October 2010	Olga Marcks	Hier wohnte Olga Marcks geb. Pick; Jg. 1895 verhaftet 12.8.1941; Polizeigefängnis Hannover; KZ Ravensbrück; Auschwitz ermordet 11.10.1942	Stolperstein für Olga Marcks in Hannover
Wißmannstraße 11; 52.35971°N 9.76382°E	20 October 2010	Else Michael	Hier wohnte Else; Michael; Jg. 1892 deportiert 15.12.1941 tot in Riga	Stolperstein für Else Michael in Hannover
Wißmannstraße 11; 52.35971°N 9.76382°E	20 October 2010	Ludwig Mosbach	Hier wohnte Ludwig Mosbach; Jg. 1874 deportiert 15.12.1941 tot in Riga	Stolperstein für Ludwig Mosbach in Hannover
Wißmannstraße 11; 52.35971°N 9.76382°E	20 October 2010	Meta Mosbach	Hier wohnte Meta Mosbach geb. Hirschberg; Jg. 1881 deportiert 15.12.1941 tot in Riga	Stolperstein für Meta Mosbach in Hannover
Wißmannstraße 11; 52.35971°N 9.76382°E	20 October 2010	Bertha Müller	Hier wohnte Bertha Müller geb. Kron; Jg. 1884 deportiert 15.12.1941 tot in Riga	Stolperstein für Bertha Müller in Hannover
Wißmannstraße 11; 52.35971°N 9.76382°E	20 October 2010	Julius Müller	Hier wohnte Julius Müller; Jg. 1874 deportiert 15.12.1941 tot in Riga	Stolperstein für Julius Müller in Hannover
Wißmannstraße 11; 52.35971°N 9.76382°E	20 October 2010	Herbert Perl	Hier wohnte Herbert Perl; Jg. 1905 deportiert 15.12.1941; Riga tot in Buchenwald	Stolperstein für Herbert Perl in Hannover
Wißmannstraße 11; 52.35971°N 9.76382°E	20 October 2010	Bella Rosenkranz	Hier wohnte Bella Rosenkranz geb. Levy; Jg. 1895 deportiert 15.12.1941; Riga tot in Stutthof	Stolperstein für Bella Rosenkranz in Hannover
Wißmannstraße 11; 52.35971°N 9.76382°E	20 October 2010	Hermann Rosenkranz	Hier wohnte Hermann Rosenkranz; Jg. 1886 deportiert 15.12.1941 tot in Riga	Stolperstein für Hermann Rosenkranz in Hannover
Wißmannstraße 11; 52.35971°N 9.76382°E	20 October 2010	Heinrich Rosenthal	Hier wohnte Dr. Heinrich Rosenthal; Jg. 1893 deportiert 1942; Theresienstadt ermordet in Auschwitz	Stolperstein für Dr. Heinrich Rosenthal in Hannover
Wißmannstraße 11; 52.35971°N 9.76382°E	20 October 2010	Friederike Rottenstein	Hier wohnte Friederike Rottenstein geb. Friedenreich; Jg. 1862 deportiert 23.7.1942; Theresienstadt tot 24.10.1942	Stolperstein für Friederike Rottenstein in Hannover
Wißmannstraße 11; 52.35971°N 9.76382°E	20 October 2010	Alfred Samuelson	Hier wohnte Alfred Samuelson; Jg. 1863 deportiert 23.7.1942; Theresienstadt tot 3.10.1942	Stolperstein für Alfred Samuelson in Hannover
Wißmannstraße 11; 52.35971°N 9.76382°E	20 October 2010	Ella Samuelson	Hier wohnte Ella Samuelson geb. Blumenthal; Jg. 1871 deportiert 23.7.1942; Theresienstadt tot 15.1.1943	Stolperstein für Ella Samuelson in Hannover
Wißmannstraße 11; 52.35971°N 9.76382°E	20 October 2010	Gertrud Selowsky	Hier wohnte Gertrud Selowsky; Jg. 1888 deportiert 15.12.1941; Riga; Stutthof tot 27.11.1944	Stolperstein für Gertrud Selowsky in Hannover
Wißmannstraße 11; 52.35971°N 9.76382°E	20 October 2010	Erich Steinberg	Hier wohnte Erich Steinberg; Jg. 1892 evangelisch deportiert 15.12.1941 tot in Riga	Stolperstein für Erich Steinberg in Hannover
Wißmannstraße 11; 52.35971°N 9.76382°E	20 October 2010	Lilli Steinberg	Hier wohnte Lilli Steinberg geb. Strauss; Jg. 1908 deportiert 15.12.1941; Riga tot in Stutthof	Stolperstein für Lilli Steinberg in Hannover
Wißmannstraße 11; 52.35971°N 9.76382°E	20 October 2010	Hannelore Strauss	Hier wohnte Hannelore Strauss; Jg. 1928 deportiert 15.12.1941; Riga tot in Stutthof	Stolperstein für Hannelore Strauss in Hannover
Wißmannstraße 11; 52.35971°N 9.76382°E	20 October 2010	Lisa Strauss	Hier wohnte Lisa Strauss; Jg. 1902 deportiert 15.12.1941; Riga; Stutthof tot 6.1.1945	Stolperstein für Lisa Strauss in Hannover
Wißmannstraße 11; 52.35971°N 9.76382°E	20 October 2010	Walter Strauss	Hier wohnte Walter Strauss; Jg. 1901 deportiert 15.12.1941; Riga tot in Stutthof	Stolperstein für Walter Strauss in Hannover
Wißmannstraße 11; 52.35971°N 9.76382°E	20 October 2010	Leopold Wolf	Hier wohnte Leopold Wolf; Jg. 1876 deportiert 23.7.1942; Theresienstadt tot 22.9.1942	Stolperstein für Leopold Wolf in Hannover
Wißmannstraße 11; 52.35971°N 9.76382°E	20 October 2010	Rosa Wolf	Hier wohnte Rosa Wolf geb. Israel; Jg. 1877 deportiert 23.7.1942; Theresienstadt tot 24.10.1942	Stolperstein für Rosa Wolf in Hannover
Wißmannstraße 11; 52.35971°N 9.76382°E	20 October 2010	Simon Zydower	Hier wohnte Simon Zydower; Jg. 1885 deportiert 15.12.1941 tot in Riga	Stolperstein für Simon Zydower in Hannover
Wißmannstraße 13; 52.35962°N 9.76408°E	20 October 2010	Hilde Abraham	Hier wohnte Hilde Abraham; Jg. 1910; Flucht in den Tod; 18.11.1941	Stolperstein für Hilde Abraham in Hannover
Wißmannstraße 13; 52.35962°N 9.76408°E	20 October 2010	Ludwig Abraham	Hier wohnte Ludwig Abraham; Jg. 1904; Flucht in den Tod; 18.11.1941	Stolperstein für Ludwig Abraham in Hannover
Wißmannstraße 13; 52.35962°N 9.76408°E	20 October 2010	Rosa Abraham	Hier wohnte Rosa Abraham geb. Löwenbach; Jg. 1877; Flucht in den Tod; 18.11.1941	Stolperstein für Rosa Abraham in Hannover
Wißmannstraße 13; 52.35962°N 9.76408°E	20 October 2010	Edgar Baum	Hier wohnte Edgar Baum; Jg. 1902 deportiert 30.6.1943; Theresienstadt ermordet in Auschwitz	Stolperstein für Edgar Baum in Hannover
Wißmannstraße 13; 52.35962°N 9.76408°E	20 October 2010	Fritzi Baum	Hier wohnte Fritzi Baum geb. Walter; Jg. 1907 deportiert 30.6.1943; Theresienstadt ermordet in Auschwitz	Stolperstein für Fritzi Baum in Hannover
Wißmannstraße 13; 52.35962°N 9.76408°E	20 October 2010	Johanna Baum	Hier wohnte Johanna Baum; Jg. 1880 deportiert ???	Stolperstein für Johanna Baum in Hannover
Wißmannstraße 13; 52.35962°N 9.76408°E	20 October 2010	Johanna Blumenfeld	Hier wohnte Johanna Blumenfeld; Jg. 1871 deportiert 23.7.1942; Theresienstadt tot 3.3.1944	Stolperstein für Johanna Blumenfeld in Hannover
Wißmannstraße 13; 52.35962°N 9.76408°E	20 October 2010	Lina Blumenfeld	Hier wohnte Lina Blumenfeld; Jg. 1876 deportiert 23.7.1942; Theresienstadt tot 28.2.1943	Stolperstein für Lina Blumenfeld in Hannover
Wißmannstraße 13; 52.35962°N 9.76408°E	20 October 2010	Eduard Eichwald	Hier wohnte Eduard Eichwald; Jg. 1867 deportiert 23.7.1942; Theresienstadt tot 29.1.1943	Stolperstein für Eduard Eichwald in Hannover
Wißmannstraße 13; 52.35962°N 9.76408°E	20 October 2010	Henny Eichwald	Hier wohnte Henny Eichwald geb. Tannenbaum; Jg. 1881 deportiert 23.7.1942; Theresienstadt ermordet in Auschwitz	Stolperstein für Henny Eichwald in Hannover
Wißmannstraße 13; 52.35962°N 9.76408°E	20 October 2010	Hedwig Goldschmidt	Hier wohnte Hedwig Goldschmidt; Jg. 1887 deportiert 15.12.1941 tot in Riga	Stolperstein für Hedwig Goldschmidt in Hannover
Wißmannstraße 13; 52.35962°N 9.76408°E	20 October 2010	Ida Hahn	Hier wohnte Ida Hahn geb. Sander; Jg. 1878 deportiert 23.7.1942; Theresienstadt ermordet in Auschwitz	Stolperstein für Ida Hahn in Hannover
Wißmannstraße 13; 52.35962°N 9.76408°E	20 October 2010	Grete Heineberg	Hier wohnte Grete Heineberg geb. Meyer; Jg. 1888 deportiert 15.12.1941 tot in Riga	Stolperstein für Grete Heineberg in Hannover
Wißmannstraße 13; 52.35962°N 9.76408°E	20 October 2010	Frieda Jonas	Hier wohnte Frieda Jonas; Jg. 1892 deportiert 15.12.1941 tot in Riga	Stolperstein für Frieda Jonas in Hannover
Wißmannstraße 13; 52.35962°N 9.76408°E	20 October 2010	Henny Jonas	Hier wohnte Henny Jonas; Jg. 1883 deportiert 15.12.1941 tot in Riga	Stolperstein für Henny Jonas in Hannover
Wißmannstraße 13; 52.35962°N 9.76408°E	20 October 2010	Martha Königsfeld	Hier wohnte Martha Königsfeld geb. Kornblum; Jg. 1881; Flucht in den Tod; 18.11.1941	Stolperstein für Martha Königsfeld in Hannover
Wißmannstraße 13; 52.35962°N 9.76408°E	20 October 2010	Ida Lamm	Hier wohnte Ida Lamm geb. Müller; Jg. 1866 deportiert 23.7.1942; Theresienstadt tot 22.2.1944	Stolperstein für Ida Lamm in Hannover
Wißmannstraße 13; 52.35962°N 9.76408°E	20 October 2010	Käthe Lazarus	Hier wohnte Käthe Lazarus geb. Loewinstein; Jg. 1885 deportiert 15.12.1941 tot in Riga	Stolperstein für Käthe Lazarus in Hannover
Wißmannstraße 13; 52.35962°N 9.76408°E	20 October 2010	Kurt Lazarus	Hier wohnte Kurt Lazarus; Jg. 1883; 25.9.1940; Gerichtsgefängnis Hannover; Auschwitz ermordet 9.6.1943	Stolperstein für Kurt Lazarus in Hannover
Wißmannstraße 13; 52.35962°N 9.76408°E	20 October 2010	Alfred Littauer	Hier wohnte Alfred Littauer; Jg. 1899 deportiert 31.3.1942; Ghetto Warschau ???	Stolperstein für Alfred Littauer in Hannover
Wißmannstraße 13; 52.35962°N 9.76408°E	20 October 2010	Käthe Littauer	Hier wohnte Käthe Littauer geb. Neuberg; Jg. 1901 deportiert 31.3.1942; Ghetto Warschau ???	Stolperstein für Käthe Littauer in Hannover
Wißmannstraße 13; 52.35962°N 9.76408°E	20 October 2010	Rahel Müller	Hier wohnte Rahel Müller; Jg. 1863 deportiert 23.7.1942; Theresienstadt tot 16.4.1943	Stolperstein für Rahel Müller in Hannover
Wißmannstraße 13; 52.35962°N 9.76408°E	20 October 2010	Hannelore Ries	Hier wohnte Hannelore Ries; Jg. 1928 deportiert 16.3.1943; Theresienstadt ermordet in Auschwitz	Stolperstein für Hannelore Ries in Hannover
Wißmannstraße 13; 52.35962°N 9.76408°E	20 October 2010	Hans Ries	Hier wohnte Dr. Hans Ries; Jg. 1896 deportiert 16.3.1943; Theresienstadt; Zwangsarbeit; Dachau/Kaufering tot 27.12.1944	Stolperstein für Dr. Hans Ries in Hannover
Wißmannstraße 13; 52.35962°N 9.76408°E	20 October 2010	Marie Ries	Hier wohnte Marie Ries geb. Salomon; Jg. 1899 deportiert 16.3.1943; Theresienstadt ermordet in Auschwitz	Stolperstein für Marie Ries in Hannover
Wißmannstraße 13; 52.35962°N 9.76408°E	20 October 2010	Else Rose	Hier wohnte Else Rose; Jg. 1900 deportiert 31.3.1942; Ghetto Warschau ???	Stolperstein für Else Rose in Hannover
Wißmannstraße 13; 52.35962°N 9.76408°E	20 October 2010	Jette Salomon	Hier wohnte Jette Salomon geb. Jacobi; Jg. 1870 deportiert 23.7.1942; Theresienstadt tot 7.4.1943	Stolperstein für Jette Salomon in Hannover
Wißmannstraße 13; 52.35962°N 9.76408°E	20 October 2010	Albert Scheiberg	Hier wohnte Albert Scheiberg; Jg. 1880; Flucht in den Tod; 1.4.1937	Stolperstein für Albert Scheiberg in Hannover
Wißmannstraße 13; 52.35962°N 9.76408°E	20 October 2010	Paula Scheiberg	Hier wohnte Paula Scheiberg geb. Scheiberg; Jg. 1887; Flucht in den Tod; 28.3.1938 in Ahlem	Stolperstein für Paula Scheiberg in Hannover
Wißmannstraße 13; 52.35962°N 9.76408°E	20 October 2010	Margarete Simon	Hier wohnte Margarete Simon; Jg. 1876 deportiert 15.12.1941 tot in Riga	Stolperstein für Margarete Simon in Hannover
Wißmannstraße 13; 52.35962°N 9.76408°E	20 October 2010	Frieda Sostmann	Hier wohnte Frieda Sostmann; Jg. 1864 deportiert 23.7.1942; Theresienstadt tot 27.1.1943	Stolperstein für Frieda Sostmann in Hannover
Wißmannstraße 13; 52.35962°N 9.76408°E	20 October 2010	Mathilde Stern	Hier wohnte Mathilde Stern; Jg. 1869 ???	Stolperstein für Mathilde Stern in Hannover
Wißmannstraße 13; 52.35962°N 9.76408°E	20 October 2010	David Wolfes	Hier wohnte David Wolfes; Jg. 1861 deportiert 23.7.1942; Theresienstadt tot 17.12.1942	Stolperstein für David Wolfes in Hannover

=== Vahrenwald-List ===
Address	Date laid	Person	Inscription	Image	Notes
Alemannstraße 18; 52.392063°N 9.731575°E	25 May 2022	Karl-Heinz Bleifeld	Hier wohnte Karl-Heinz Bleifeld; Jg. 1920 desertiert verhaftet verurteilt 16.12.1942 hingerichtet 15.1.1943; Zuchthaus; Brandenburg-Görden		
Bödekerstraße 82; 52.386669°N 9.751710°E	6 October 2011	Margarete Cohn	Hier wohnte Margarete Cohn; Jg. 1905 deportiert 15.12.1941 tot in Riga		
Bödekerstraße 82; 52.386669°N 9.751710°E	6 October 2011	Hildegard Cohn	Hier wohnte Hildegard Cohn; Jg. 1930 deportiert 15.12.1941 tot in Riga		
Bödekerstraße 82; 52.386669°N 9.751710°E	24 May 2023	Ida Kornberg	Hier wohnte Ida Kornberg geb. Lilienstern; Jg. 1884 deportiert 15.12.1941; Riga; 1944 Stutthof ermordet		
Bödekerstraße 82; 52.386669°N 9.751710°E	24 May 2023	Emil Kornberg	Hier wohnte Emil Kornberg; Jg. 1882 deportiert 15.12.1941 ermordet in Riga		
Bödekerstraße 82; 52.386669°N 9.751710°E	24 May 2023	Hermann Kornberg	Hier wohnte Hermann Kornberg; Jg. 1885 deportiert 15.12.1941; Riga ermordet 28.1.1944		
Bödekerstraße 82; 52.386669°N 9.751710°E	24 May 2023	Emilie Kornberg	Hier wohnte Emilie Kornberg geb. Rosenstern; Jg. 1888 deportiert 15.12.1941; Riga ermordet		
Bödekerstraße 82; 52.386669°N 9.751710°E	24 May 2023	Ilse Kornberg	Hier wohnte Ilse Kornberg; Jg. 1923 deportiert 15.12.1941; Riga befreit		
Bödekerstraße 88; 52.387119°N 9.751456°E	11 July 2019	Karl-Wilhelm Meyer-Albrand	Hier wohnte Karl-Wilhelm; Meyer-Albrand; Jg. 1912 verhaftet 20.1.1942 'Wehrkraftzersetzung' verurteilt 8.4.1943 enthauptet 31.3.1944; Zuchthaus Halle	Stolperstein, Karl-Wilhelm Meyer-Albrand in Hannover, Bödekerstraße 88 vom 09.11.2022	
Bödekerstraße 100; 52.388000°N 9.751041°E	25 May 2022	Sidonie 'Toni' Simon	Hier wohnte Sidonie 'Toni' Simon geb. Grünenbaum; Jg. 1904 deportiert 15.12.1941; Riga ermordet		
Bödekerstraße 100; 52.388000°N 9.751041°E	25 May 2022	Paul Simon	Hier wohnte Paul Simon; Jg. 1899 'Schutzhaft' 1938; Buchenwalddeportiert 15.12.1941; Riga ermordet		
Bödekerstraße 100; 52.388000°N 9.751041°E	25 May 2022	Winfried Grünenbaum	Hier wohnte Winfried Grünenbaum; Jg. 1929 deportiert 15.12.1941; Riga ermordet		
Bödekerstraße 100; 52.388000°N 9.751041°E	25 May 2022	Hermann-Egon Simon	Hier wohnte Hermann-Egon Simon; Jg. 1930 deportiert 15.12.1941; Riga ermordet		
Bödekerstraße 100; 52.388000°N 9.751041°E	25 May 2022	Horst Simon	Hier wohnte Horst Simon; Jg. 1931 deportiert 15.12.1941; Riga ermordet		
Bothfelder Straße 8; 52.39691°N 9.76300°E	6 October 2011	Alfred Strauss	Hier wohnte Alfred Strauss; Jg. 1893; Flucht 1938; Australien überlebt		
Bothfelder Straße 8; 52.39691°N 9.76300°E	6 October 2011	Ilse Strauss	Hier wohnte Ilse Strauss geb. Plaut; Jg. 1904; Flucht 1938; Australien überlebt		
Bothfelder Straße 8; 52.39691°N 9.76300°E	6 October 2011	Werner Strauss	Hier wohnte Werner Strauss; Jg. 1930; Flucht 1938; Australien überlebt		
Brahmsstraße 4; 52.393758°N 9.760451°E	25 May 2022	Joseph Schorsch	Hier wohnte Joseph Schorsch; Jg. 1892; Flucht 1938; USA		
Brahmsstraße 4; 52.393758°N 9.760451°E	25 May 2022	Friedel Schorsch	Hier wohnte Friedel Schorsch geb. Meyer; Jg. 1903; Flucht 1938; USA		
Bülowstraße 6; 52.392460°N 9.738143°E	27 March 2025	Max Bragenheim	Hier wohnte Max Bragenheim; Jg. 1880 deportiert 11.1.1944; Theresienstadt; 1944 Auschwitz ermordet		
Bütersworthstraße 2; 52.382396°N 9.750270°E	27 March 2025	Karoline Stadler	Hier wohnte Karoline Stadler geb. Ascher; Jg. 1871 deportiert 15.12.1941; Ghetto Riga ermordet		
Bunsenstraße 8; 52.394244°N 9.752708°E	11 July 2019	Adolf Samulon	Hier wohnte Adolf Samulon; Jg. 1883 deportiert 1942; Ghetto Warschau ermordet	Stolperstein für Adolf Samulon in Hannover	
Bunsenstraße 8; 52.394244°N 9.752708°E	11 July 2019	Ida Samulon	Hier wohnte Ida Samulon geb. Hoffmann; Jg. 1883 deportiert 1942; Ghetto Warschau ermordet	Stolperstein für Ida Samulon in Hannover	
Bunsenstraße 8; 52.394244°N 9.752708°E	11 July 2019	Dirk Samulon	Hier wohnte Dirk Samulon; Jg. 1918; Flucht 1936; USA	Stolperstein für Dirk Samulon in Hannover	
Cillienstraße 6; 52.38979°N 9.73558°E	20 November 2015	Wilhelm Fahlbusch	Hier wohnte Wilhelm Fahlbusch; Jg. 1907 im Widerstand/SPD verschleppt von SA; 30.6.1933; Lokal Blume misshandelt tot 8.7.1933	Stolperstein für Wilhelm Fahlbusch in Hannover	
Ferdinand-Wallbrecht-Straße 18; 52.390607°N 9.748831°E	11 July 2019	August Moos	Hier wohnte August Moos; Jg. 1893; Flucht 1939; Jugoslawien deportiert 1944; Bergen-Belsen; Buchenwald ermordet 30.12.1944		
Ferdinand-Wallbrecht-Straße 18; 52.390607°N 9.748831°E	11 July 2019	Marie Moos	Hier wohnte Marie Moos geb. Thalmessinger; Jg. 1873; Flucht 1940; Jugoslawien deportiert 1944; Bergen-Belsen ermordet 8.10.1944		
Ferdinand-Wallbrecht-Straße 18; 52.390607°N 9.748831°E	11 July 2019	Walter Moos	Hier wohnte Walter Moos; Jg. 1930; Flucht 1940; Jugoslawien deportiert 1944; Bergen-Belsen befreit tot an Haftfolgen		
Ferdinand-Wallbrecht-Straße 23; 52.39113°N 9.74788°E	7 December 2017	Fritz Aron Wallach	Hier wohnte Fritz Aron; Wallach; Jg. 1889 deportiert 15.12.1941; Riga; 1944 Dachau ermordet 31.8.1944; Aussenlager Kaufering	Stolperstein, Fritz Aron Wallach in Hannover, Ferdinand-Wallbrecht-Straße 23 vom 09.11.2022	
Ferdinand-Wallbrecht-Straße 23; 52.39113°N 9.74788°E	7 December 2017	Kurt Wallach	Hier wohnte Kurt Wallach; Jg. 1919; Flucht 1939; England	Stolperstein, Kurt Wallach in Hannover, Ferdinand-Wallbrecht-Straße 23 vom 09.11.2022	
Ferdinand-Wallbrecht-Straße 23; 52.39113°N 9.74788°E	7 December 2017	Elise Wallach	Hier wohnte Elise Wallach geb. Herz; Jg. 1887 deportiert 15.12.1941 ermordet in Riga	Stolperstein, Elise Wallach in Hannover, Ferdinand-Wallbrecht-Straße 23 vom 09.11.2022	
Ferdinand-Wallbrecht-Straße 34; 52.39208°N 9.74743°E	12 June 2013	Anna Edersheim	Hier wohnte Anna Edersheim geb. Redelmeier; Jg. 1880; Flucht Holland interniert Westerbork deportiert 1943 ermordet in Sobibor	File:Stolperstein, Anna Edersheim in Hannover, Ferdinand-Wallbrecht-Straße 34 vom 09.11.2022	
Ferdinand-Wallbrecht-Straße 34; 52.39208°N 9.74743°E	12 June 2013	Paula Jacobson	Hier wohnte Paula Jacobson geb. Redelmeier; Jg. 1878; Flucht Holland interniert Westerbork deportiert ermordet in Sobibor	Stolperstein, Paula Jacobsen in Hannover, Ferdinand-Wallbrecht-Straße 34 vom 09.11.2022	
Ferdinand-Wallbrecht-Straße 34; 52.39208°N 9.74743°E	12 June 2013	Adolf Meyer	Hier wohnte Adolf Meyer; Jg. 1859 deportiert 23.7.1942; Theresienstadt tot 14.8.1942	File:Stolperstein, Adolf Meyer in Hannover, Ferdinand-Wallbrecht-Straße 34 vom 09.11.2022	
Ferdinand-Wallbrecht-Straße 38; 52.39251°N 9.74711°E	7 December 2017	Anneliese Cohen	Hier wohnte Anneliese Cohen geb. Braunthal; Jg. 1913; Flucht 1937 Holland interniert Westerbork deportiert 1943; Auschwitz ermordet 11.2.1944	File:Stolperstein für Anneliese Cohen in Hannover	
Ferdinand-Wallbrecht-Straße 38; 52.39251°N 9.74711°E	7 December 2017	Herbert Cohen	Hier wohnte Herbert Cohen; Jg. 1901; Flucht 1937 Holland interniert Westerbork deportiert 1944; Auschwitz ermordet 18.2.1944	File:Stolperstein für Herbert Cohen in Hannover	
Gabelsbergerstraße 10; 52.39137°N 9.74551°E	12 June 2013	Marie Sternheim	Hier wohnte Marie Sternheim; Jg. 1874 deportiert am 15.12.1941 tot in Riga	Stolperstein für Marie Sternheim in Hannover	
Harnischstraße 2; 52.38957°N 9.74526°E	21 October 2010	Henriette Weil	Hier wohnte Henriette Weil geb. Moses; Jg. 1882 deportiert 15.12.1941 tot in Riga		
Harnischstraße 2; 52.38957°N 9.74526°E	21 October 2010	Rudolf Weil	Hier wohnte Rudolf Weil; Jg. 1907 aus Wunstorfer Anstalten; 21.9.1940 nach Landesanstalt; Brandenburg ermordet 1940		
Harnischstraße 3; 52.38972°N 9.74537°E	21 October 2010	Emilie Blumenthal	Hier wohnte Emilie Blumenthal geb. Rosenstein; Jg. 1859 deportiert 23.7.1942; Theresienstadt tot 26.9.1942	Stolperstein für Emilie Blumenthal in Hannover	
Harnischstraße 4; 52.39021°N 9.74584°E	21 October 2010	Heinrich Jokl	Hier wohnte Heinrich Jokl; Jg. 1882 verhaftet 19.8.1943 'Zigarettenbesitz'; Gestapo-KZ Larde ermordet 14.10.1943	Stolperstein für Heinrich Jokl in Hannover	
Harnischstraße 6; 52.39050°N 9.74606°E	21 October 2010	Joachim Schendel	Hier wohnte Dr. Joachim; Schendel; Jg. 1902 deportiert 23.7.1942; Theresienstadt ermordet in Auschwitz		When the pavement was rebuilt, the stones were relaid in their original order
Harnischstraße 6; 52.39050°N 9.74606°E	21 October 2010	Charlotte Schendel	Hier wohnte Charlotte; Schendel geb. Hauff; Jg. 1902 deportiert 23.7.1942; Theresienstadt ermordet in Auschwitz		
Harnischstraße 6; 52.39050°N 9.74606°E	21 October 2010	Luise Spiegel	Hier wohnte Luise Spiegel geb. Seckel; Jg. 1869 deportiert 23.7.1942; Theresienstadt ermordet in Treblinka		
Harnischstraße 6; 52.39050°N 9.74606°E	21 October 2010	Elfriede Kirchheimer	Hier wohnte Elfriede; Kirchheimer geb. Spiegel; Jg. 1879 deportiert 15.12.1941 tot in Riga		
Harnischstraße 6; 52.39050°N 9.74606°E	21 October 2010	Lotte Karger	Hier wohnte Lotte Karger; Jg. 1896 deportiert 15.12.1941 tot in Riga		
Harnischstraße 7; 52.39061°N 9.74615°E	21 October 2010	Siegfried Loewenthal	Hier wohnte Dr. Siegfried; Loewenthal; Jg. 1867 deportiert 23.7.1942; Theresienstadt tot 16.8.1942		When the pavement was rebuilt, the stones were relaid in their original order
Harnischstraße 7; 52.39061°N 9.74615°E	21 October 2010	Toni Loewenthal	Hier wohnte Toni; Loewenthal geb. Meyerstein; Jg. 1872 deportiert 23.7.1942; Theresienstadt tot 23.8.1942		
Harnischstraße 7; 52.39061°N 9.74615°E	21 October 2010	Mathilde Neuhaus	Hier wohnte Mathilde Neuhaus geb. Soldin; Jg. 1869 deportiert 23.7.1942; Theresienstadt ermordet in Treblinka		
Harnischstraße 7; 52.39061°N 9.74615°E	21 October 2010	Jacob Löwenstein	Hier wohnte Jacob Löwenstein; Jg. 1873 verhaftet KZ Liebenau tot 18.4.1941		
Harnischstraße 7; 52.39061°N 9.74615°E	14 July 2026	Siegfried Haas	Hier wohnte Siegfried Haas; Jg. 1896; Flucht 1938; Luxemburg; 1940 USA		
Harnischstraße 7; 52.39061°N 9.74615°E	14 July 2026	Lizzie Haas	Hier wohnte Lizzie Haas geb. Joel; Jg. 1902; Flucht 1938; Luxemburg; 1940 USA		
Harnischstraße 7; 52.39061°N 9.74615°E	14 July 2026	Vera Haas	Hier wohnte Vera Haas; Jg. 1925; Flucht 1938; Luxemburg; Frankreich; 1940 USA		
Harnischstraße 7; 52.39061°N 9.74615°E	14 July 2026	Ruth Haas	Hier wohnte Ruth Haas; Jg. 1928; Flucht 1938; Luxemburg; Frankreich; 1940 USA		
Harnischstraße 10; 52.39045°N 9.74568°E	21 October 2010	Gisela Jurberger	Hier wohnte Gisela Jurberger; Jg. 1874; Flucht in den Tod; 20.7.1942	Stolperstein, Gisela Jurberger in Hannover, Harnischstraße 10 vom 09.11.2022	
Harnischstraße 12; 52.38984°N 9.74516°E	21 October 2010	Emma Hess	Hier wohnte Emma Hess geb. Frankenstein; Jg. 1867 deportiert 23.7.1942; Theresienstadt tot 29.6.1942	Stolperstein für Emma Hess in Hannover	
In der Steinriede 4; 52.38657°N 9.75051°E	13 October 2023	Dr. Max Schleisner	Hier wohnte Dr. Max Schleisner; Jg. 1885 deportiert 16.3.1943; Theresienstadt ermordet 18.7.1943		
In der Steinriede 4; 52.38657°N 9.75051°E	13 October 2023	Gerda Schleisner	Hier wohnte Gerda Schleisner geb. Weinstein; Jg. 1895 deportiert 16.3.1943; Theresienstadt; 1944 Auschwitz ermordet		
In der Steinriede 4; 52.38657°N 9.75051°E	13 October 2023	Eva Schleisner	Hier wohnte Eva Schleisner; Jg. 1921 deportiert 16.3.1943; Theresienstadt; 1944 Auschwitz ermordet		
Jakobistraße 21; 52.38976°N 9.74594°E	3 March 2009	Hedwig Frank	Hier wohnte Hedwig Frank geb. Nordheimer; Jg. 1867 deportiert 1942; Theresienstadt tot 9.2.1945	Stolperstein für Hedwig Frank in Hannover	
Hohenzollernstraße 55; 52.387487°N 9.752802°E	11 July 2019	Gutta Meyer	Hier wohnte Gutta Meyer; Geb. Rosenbusch; Jg. 1865; Flucht 1939 Belgien interniert Mechelen deportiert 1948 ermordet in Auschwitz	Stolperstein für Gutta Meyer in Hannover	
Husarenstraße 6; 52.39283°N 9.743788°E	11 July 2019	Emilie Erbse	Hier wohnte Emilie Erbse; Geb. Kassel; Jg. 1877 deportiert 15.12.1941 ermordet in Riga	Stolperstein für Emilie Erbse in Hannover	
Liebigstraße 20; 52.39373°N 9.75635°E	6 October 2014	Marta Geldmacher	Hier wohnte Marta Geldmacher; Jg. 1875; Flucht 1937; Holland interniert Westerbork deportiert 9.10.1942 ermordet in Auschwitz	Stolperstein für Marta Geldmacher in Hannover	
Lister Meile 77/79; 52.3875°N 9.7494°E	18 September 2013	Arthur Goldwein	Hier wohnte Arthur Goldwein; Jg. 1913; Flucht 1938 Holland verhaftet 1941 deportiert 1941; Mauthausen tot 1.10.1941		
Lister Meile 77/79; 52.3875°N 9.7494°E	18 September 2013	Erna Jacobs	Hier wohnte Erna Jacobs geb. Goldwein; Jg. 1905 deportiert 15.12.1941 tot in Riga		
Lister Meile 77/79; 52.3875°N 9.7494°E	18 September 2013	Gerson Jacobs	Hier wohnte Gerson Jacobs; Jg. 1903 deportiert 15.12.1941 tot in Riga		
Lister Meile 77/79; 52.3875°N 9.7494°E	18 September 2013	Philipp Jacobs	Hier wohnte Philipp Jacobs; Jg. 1905 deportiert 15.12.1941 tot in Riga		
Lister Meile 77/79; 52.3875°N 9.7494°E	18 September 2013	Frieda Katzenberg	Hier wohnte Frieda Katzenberg geb. Hammerschlag; Jg. 1880 deportiert 15.12.1941 tot in Riga		
Lister Meile 77/79; 52.3875°N 9.7494°E	18 September 2013	Saul Israel Sojbel	Hier wohnte Saul Israel; Sojbel; Jg. 1870 'Polenaktion' 1938; Ghetto Warschau tot 28.8.1941		
Lister Meile 77/79; 52.3875°N 9.7494°E	18 September 2013	Amalie Debora Weintraub	Hier wohnte Amalie Debora; Weintraub geb. Klein; Jg. 1875; Flucht 1939 Holland interniert Westerbork deportiert 1943 ermordet in Auschwitz		
Lister Meile 77/79; 52.3875°N 9.7494°E	18 September 2013	Moritz Weintraub	Hier wohnte Moritz; Weintraub; Jg. 1880; Flucht 1939 Holland interniert Westerbork deportiert 1943 ermordet in Auschwitz		
Lister Meile 77/79; 52.3875°N 9.7494°E	26 September 2018	Toni Kreutzmann	Hier wohnte Toni Kreutzmann geb. Dahlheim; Jg. 1885 vor Deportation 1944 versteckt mit Hilfe überlebt		
Lister Meile 83; 52.38793°N 9.74918°E	13 November 2008	Kurt Willkomm	Hier wohnte Kurt Willkomm; Jg. 1904 verhaftet 5.11.1933; Polizeigefängnis gefoltert tot 16.11.933	Stolperstein, Kurt Willkomm in Hannover, Lister Meile 83 vom 09.11.2022	
Podbielskistraße 8; 52.38917°N 9.751744°E	11 July 2019	Karl Neuburger	Hier wohnte Karl Neuburger; Jg. 1893 deportiert 15.12.1941 ermordet in Riga	Stolperstein, Karl Neuburger in Hannover, Podbielskistraße 8 vom 09.11.2022	
Podbielskistraße 8; 52.38917°N 9.751744°E	11 July 2019	Johanna Neuburger	Hier wohnte Johanna Neuburger geb. Beverstein; Jg. 1893 deportiert 15.12.1941 ermordet in Riga	Stolperstein, Johanna Neuburger in Hannover, Podbielskistraße 8 vom 09.11.2022	
Podbielskistraße 8; 52.38917°N 9.751744°E	11 July 2019	Kurt Neuburger	Hier wohnte Kurt Neuburger; Jg. 1925 deportiert 15.12.1941 ermordet in Riga	Stolperstein, Kurt Neuburger in Hannover, Podbielskistraße 8 vom 09.11.2022	
Podbielskistraße 8; 52.38917°N 9.751744°E	11 July 2019	Heinz Alfred Neuburger	Hier wohnte Heinz Alfred; Neuburger; Jg. 1930 deportiert 15.12.1941 ermordet in Riga		
Podbielskistraße 20; 52.389946°N 9.753059°E	21 June 2024	Alfred Lichtenberg	Hier wohnte Alfred Lichtenberg; Jg. 1881; Flucht 1938; Holland; 1939 USA		
Podbielskistraße 20; 52.389946°N 9.753059°E	21 June 2024	Gertrud Lichtenberg	Hier wohnte Gertrud Lichtenberg geb. Falk; Jg. 1889; Flucht 1938; Holland; 1939 USA		
Podbielskistraße 20; 52.389946°N 9.753059°E	21 June 2024	Käthe Philipp	Hier wohnte Käthe Philipp geb. Lichtenberg; Jg. 1913; Flucht 1933 Holland deportiert 26.2.1944; Theresienstadt; 1944 Auschwitz; KZ Bergen-Belsen ermordet		
Podbielskistraße 20; 52.389946°N 9.753059°E	21 June 2024	Hermann Lichtenberg	Hier wohnte Hermann; Lichtenberg; Jg. 1920; Flucht 1938; Holland; 1939 USA		
Podbielskistraße 36; 52.39126°N 9.75565°E	22 March 2010	Elsbeth Rüdenberg	Hier wohnte Elsbeth Rüdenberg geb. Salmony; Jg. 1886 deportiert 15.12.1941 tot in Riga		
Podbielskistraße 36; 52.39126°N 9.75565°E	22 March 2010	Gustav Rüdenberg	Hier wohnte Gustav Rüdenberg; Jg. 1868 deportiert 15.12.1941 tot in Riga		
Podbielskistraße 43; 52.39179°N 9.75590°E	4 December 2012	Frieda Michelsohn	Hier wohnte Frieda Michelsohn geb. Haas; Jg. 1882 deportiert 15.12.1941 tot in Riga		
Podbielskistraße 43; 52.39179°N 9.75590°E	4 December 2012	Max Michelsohn	Hier wohnte Max Michelsohn; Jg. 1875 deportiert 15.12.1941 tot in Riga		
Podbielskistraße 48; 52.39182°N 9.75668°E	17 October 2014	Hedwig Seckel	Hier wohnte Hedwig Seckel geb. Baer; Jg. 1889 gedemütigt/entrechtet Flucht in den Tod; 22.3.1941	Stolperstein für Hedwig Seckel in Hannover	
Podbielskistraße 49; 52.392295°N 9.756846°E	27 March 2025	Dr. Max Bergmann	Hier wohnte Dr. Max; Bergmann; Jg. 1874 deportiert 23.7.1942; Theresienstadt; 1944 Auschwitz ermordet		
Podbielskistraße 49; 52.392295°N 9.756846°E	27 March 2025	Leopold Bergmann	Hier wohnte Leopold; Bergmann; Jg. 1902 deportiert 15.12.1941; Ghetto Riga ermordet		
Podbielskistraße 49; 52.392295°N 9.756846°E	27 March 2025	Elisabeth Bergmann	Hier wohnte Elisabeth; Bergmann; Jg. 1906 deportiert 23.7.1942; Theresienstadt; 1944 Auschwitz ermordet		
Podbielskistraße 92; 52.39479°N 9.76242°E	4 December 2012	Ida Danziger	Hier wohnte Ida Danziger geb. Neuberg; Jg. 1862 deportiert 23.7.1942; Theresienstadt tot 9.10.1942	Stolperstein für Ida Danziger in Hannover	
Podbielskistraße 93; 52.392223°N 9.756712°E	28 April 2025	Wilhelm Neuberg	Hier wohnte Wilhelm Neuberg; Jg. 1888 'Schutzhaft' 1938; Flucht 1939; Holland; USA		
Podbielskistraße 93; 52.392223°N 9.756712°E	28 April 2025	Anna Neuberg	Hier wohnte Anna Neuberg geb. Philippstein; Jg. 1893; Flucht 1939; Holland; USA		
Podbielskistraße 93; 52.392223°N 9.756712°E	28 April 2025	Gerd Neuberg	Hier wohnte Gerd Neuberg; Jg. 1925; Flucht 1939; Holland; USA		
Richard-Wagner-Straße 22; 52.39380°N 9.76236°E	12 June 2013	Rudolf Herzberg	Hier wohnte Rudolf Herzberg; Jg. 1884; Flucht 1941; Kuba überlebt		
Richard-Wagner-Straße 22; 52.39380°N 9.76236°E	12 June 2013	Lilly Herzberg	Hier wohnte Lilly Herzberg geb. Cohen; Jg. 1886; Flucht 1941; Kuba überlebt		
Richard-Wagner-Straße 22; 52.39380°N 9.76236°E	12 June 2013	Nanny Ronsheim	Hier wohnte Nanny Ronsheim geb. Herzberg; Jg. 1908; Flucht 1934; Südafrika überlebt		
Richard-Wagner-Straße 22; 52.39380°N 9.76236°E	12 June 2013	Bernhard Herzberg	Hier wohnte Bernhard Herzberg; Jg. 1909; Flucht 1933; Südafrika überlebt		
Richard-Wagner-Straße 22; 52.39380°N 9.76236°E	12 June 2013	Ruth Lang	Hier wohnte Ruth Lang geb. Herzberg; Jg. 1909; Flucht 1933; Italien tod an Diphtherie; Prag		
Röntgenstraße 4; 52.393495°N 9.752639°E	11 July 2019	Elise Ahrens	Hier wohnte Elise Ahrens geb. Sabel; Jg. 1865 deportiert 13.7.1942; Theresienstadt ermordet 30.9.1942	Stolperstein für Elise Ahrens in Hannover	
Rühmkorffstraße 18; 52.39098°N 9.75311°E	6 October 2011	Ilse Sochaczewski	Hier wohnte Dr. Walter; Sochaczewski; Jg. 1881 vor Verhaftung; Flucht 1936; Holland; Belgien; 1937 Belgien überlebt		
Rühmkorffstraße 18; 52.39098°N 9.75311°E	6 October 2011	Walter Sochaczewski	Hier wohnte Ilse Sochaczewski geb. Meyerstein; Jg. 1892 vor Verhaftung; Flucht 1936; Schweiz; Belgien; 1937 Brasilien überlebt		
Vahrenwalder Straße 18; 52.38704°N 9.73446°E	30 September 2016	Arno Behrendt	Hier wohnte Dr. Arno Behrendt; Jg. 1893; Flucht 1938; Tschechoslowakei deportiert 1941; Theresienstadt ermordet 1944; Auschwitz	Stolperstein für Arno Behrendt in Hannover	
Vahrenwalder Straße 67; 52.39142°N 9.73446°E	6 December 2007	Hans Rosenbaum	Hier wohnte Hans Rosenbaum; Jg. 1920 aus Rotenburger; Anstalten am 21.9.1940 nach 'Heilanstalt’ Brandenburg ermordet 1940		
Vahrenwalder Straße 67; 52.39142°N 9.73446°E	6 December 2007	Jenny Rosenbaum	Hier wohnte Jenny Rosenbaum geb. Jacobowitz; Jg. 1890 deportiert 15.12.1941; Riga erschossen April 1944 im Wald von Bikernieki		
Walderseestraße 29; 52.39385°N 9.76461°E	18 September 2013	Bernhard Steinberg	Hier wohnte Bernhard; Steinberg; Jg. 1915; Flucht 1937; Argentinien überlebt		
Walderseestraße 29; 52.39385°N 9.76461°E	18 September 2013	Ellen Steinberg	Hier wohnte Ellen Steinberg; Jg. 1912; Flucht 1939; Argentinien überlebt		
Walderseestraße 29; 52.39385°N 9.76461°E	18 September 2013	Kurt Steinberg	Hier wohnte Kurt Steinberg; Jg. 1916; Flucht 1937; Argentinien überlebt		
Walderseestraße 29; 52.39385°N 9.76461°E	18 September 2013	Lilly Steinberg	Hier wohnte Lilly Steinberg geb. Leeser; Jg. 1886; Flucht 1939; Argentinien überlebt		
Walderseestraße 29; 52.39385°N 9.76461°E	18 September 2013	Paul Steinberg	Hier wohnte Paul Steinberg; Jg. 1873; Flucht 1939; Argentinien überlebt		
Waldstraße 38; 52.39198°N 9.75357°E	30 September 2016	Sally Bähr	Hier wohnte Sally Bähr; Jg. 1883; Flucht 1938; Frankreich interniert Antibes tot 22.12.1939; Nizza	Stolperstein für Sally Bähr in Hannover	
Waldstraße 38; 52.39198°N 9.75357°E	30 September 2016	Max Elkan	Hier wohnte Max Elkan; Jg. 1916 deportiert 15.12.1941; Riga ermordet	Stolperstein für Max Elkan in Hannover	
Waldstraße 38; 52.39198°N 9.75357°E	30 September 2016	Arthur Werner Katz	Hier wohnte Arthur Werner; Katz; Jg. 1932 deportiert 15.12.1941 ermordet in Riga	Stolperstein für Arthur Werner Katz in Hannover	
Waldstraße 38; 52.39198°N 9.75357°E	30 September 2016	Berta Katz	Hier wohnte Berta Katz geb. Haas; Jg. 1887 deportiert 15.12.1941; Riga ermordet 6.12.1944	Stolperstein für Berta Katz in Hannover	
Waldstraße 38; 52.39198°N 9.75357°E	30 September 2016	Irmgard Katz	Hier wohnte Irmgard Katz verh. Fleischhower; Jg. 1913; Flucht 1937 Holland interniert deportiert 1944 ermordet in Bergen-Belsen	Stolperstein für Irmgard Katz in Hannover	
Waldstraße 38; 52.39198°N 9.75357°E	30 September 2016	Louis Katz	Hier wohnte Louis Katz; Jg. 1878 deportiert 15.12.1941 ermordet in Riga	Stolperstein für Louis Katz in Hannover	
Waldstraße 38; 52.39198°N 9.75357°E	30 September 2016	Minna Levy	Hier wohnte Minna Levy geb. Schwabe; Jg. 1870 deportiert 23.7.1942; Theresienstadt ermordet 3.2.1943	Stolperstein für Minna Levy in Hannover	
Waldstraße 38; 52.39198°N 9.75357°E	30 September 2016	Emma Meyer	Hier wohnte Emma Meyer geb. Klaber; Jg. 1878 deportiert 23.7.1942; Theresienstadt ermordet 6.3.1943	Stolperstein für Emma Meyer in Hannover	
Waldstraße 38; 52.39198°N 9.75357°E	30 September 2016	Moritz Meyer	Hier wohnte Moritz Meyer; Jg. 1871 deportiert 23.7.1942; Theresienstadt ermordet 19.2.1943	Stolperstein für Moritz Meyer in Hannover	
Waldstraße 38; 52.39198°N 9.75357°E	30 September 2016	Heinz Jakob Moritz	Hier wohnte Heinz Jakob; Moritz; Jg. 1901 deportiert 1943; Auschwitz ermordet 31.3.1943	Stolperstein für Heinz Jakob Moritz in Hannover	
Waldstraße 38; 52.39198°N 9.75357°E	30 September 2016	Amalie Wertheimer	Hier wohnte Amalie; Wertheimer geb. Visser; Jg. 1904 deportiert 15.12.1941; Riga ermordet 6.12.1944; Stutthof	Stolperstein für Amalie Wertheimer in Hannover	
Waldstraße 38; 52.39198°N 9.75357°E	30 September 2016	Heinz Wertheimer	Hier wohnte Heinz Wertheimer; Jg. 1900 deportiert 15.12.1941 ermordet in Riga	Stolperstein für Heinz Wertheimer in Hannover	

== See also ==
- List of places with Stolpersteine
- List of Stolpersteine in Hamelin
