= List of Stolpersteine in Hamelin =

Memorial installations in Germany

This article lists the Stolpersteine laid in the city of Hamelin, Lower Saxony, as part of the ongoing project by artist Gunter Demnig.

== History ==
Between 2013 and 2018, 78 Stolpersteine were laid in Hameln. In 2026, a further 4Stolpersteine were added. The 10 × 10 cm concrete blocks with brass plaques are embedded in the pavement in front of the houses where the victims of National Socialist rule once lived. The inscription on the plaque provides information about their name, age and fate. The Stolpersteine are intended to prevent the victims from being forgotten. On 9 November 2016, a cleaning event for the Stolpersteine took place in Hameln for the first time, attended by 30 people from ecclesiastical, political and cultural-historical associations, including the Hameln historian Bernhard Gelderblom.

== Stolpersteine in Hamelin ==
Address	Date of laying	Person	Inscription	Image
Baustraße 16	November 26, 2013	Albert Jonas (1871–1942)	HIER WOHNTE ALBERT JONAS JG. 1871 ’SCHUTZHAFT’ 1938 BUCHENWALD DEPORTIERT 1942 THERESIENSTADT TOT 13.8.1942	
Baustraße 16	November 26, 2013	Bertha Jonas (1873–1944)	HIER WOHNTE BERTHA JONAS GEB. ROTHENBERG JG. 1873 DEPORTIERT 1942 THERESIENSTADT TOT 25.7.1944	
Baustraße 16	November 26, 2013	Else Jonas (1900–?)	HIER WOHNTE ELSE JONAS VERH. BIRNBAUM JG. 1900 DEPORTIERT 1942 WARSCHAU ERMORDET	
Baustraße 16	November 26, 2013	Arthur Jonas (1905–?)	HIER WOHNTE ARTHUR JONAS JG. 1905 „SCHUTZHAFT“ 1938 BUCHENWALD FLUCHT 1939 ENGLAND ÜBERLEBT	
Baustraße 16	November 26, 2013	Anneliese Jonas (1908–?)	HIER WOHNTE ANNELIESE JONAS JG. 1908 UNFREIWILLIG VERZOGEN 1939 BIELEFELD DEPORTIERT 1943 THERESIENSTADT ERMORDET IN AUSCHWITZ	
Neue Marktstraße 14	November 26, 2013	Rosa Culp (1867–1943)	HIER WOHNTE ROSA CULP GEB. WEINBERG JG. 1867 DEPORTIERT 1942 THERESIENSTADT TOT 20.12.1943	
Neue Marktstraße 14	November 26, 2013	Sophie Friedheim (1909–?)	HIER WOHNTE SOPHIE FRIEDHEIM GEB. CULP JG. 1909 DEPORTIERT 1943 ERMORDET IN AUSCHWITZ	
Neue Marktstraße 14	November 26, 2013	Ingrid Friedheim (1936–?)	HIER WOHNTE INGRID FRIEDHEIM JG. 1936 DEPORTIERT 1943 ERMORDET IN AUSCHWITZ	
Werder 16, Tündern	November 26, 2013	Emilie Jonas (1864–1942)	HIER WOHNTE EMILIE JONAS JG. 1864 DEPORTIERT 1942 THERESIENSTADT TOT 13.8.1942	
Werder 16, Tündern	November 26, 2013	Alice Jonas (1908–1942)	HIER WOHNTE ALICE JONAS JG. 1908 UNFREIWILLIG VERZOGEN 1939 HANNOVER DEPORTIERT 1941 ERMORDET IN RIGA	
Pyrmonter Straße 29	March 28, 2014	Ernst Jahn (de)(1903–1935)	HIER WOHNTE ERNST JAHN JG. 1903 IM WIDERSTAND / SPD ERMORDET VON SA 5.2.1935 WESERSCHLEUSE	
Bäckerstraße 25	March 28, 2014	Gustav Behrendt (1880–?)	HIER WOHNTE GUSTAV BEHRENDT JG. 1880 ’SCHUTZHAFT’ 1938 BUCHENWALD DEPORTIERT 1942 GHETTO WARSCHAU ERMORDET	
Bäckerstraße 45	March 28, 2014	Carl Friedheim (1869–1935)	HIER WOHNTE CARL FRIEDHEIM JG. 1869 UNFREIWILLIG VERZOGEN 1935 LEIPZIG TOT 8.11.1935	
Bäckerstraße 45	March 28, 2014	Henriette Friedheim (1875–1944)	HIER WOHNTE HENRIETTE FRIEDHEIM GEB. KANSTEIN JG. 1875 UNFREIWILLIG VERZOGEN 1935 LEIPZIG DEPORTIERT 1942 THERESIENSTADT TOT 8.7.1944	
Bäckerstraße 45	March 28, 2014	Therese Friedheim (1900–?)	HIER WOHNTE THERESE FRIEDHEIM JG. 1900 FLUCHT 1933 PALÄSTINA ÜBERLEBT	
Bäckerstraße 45	March 28, 2014	Alfred Friedheim (1901–?)	HIER WOHNTE ALFRED FRIEDHEIM JG. 1901 FLUCHT 1934 USA ÜBERLEBT	
Bäckerstraße 45	March 28, 2014	Heinz Friedheim (1908–?)	HIER WOHNTE HEINZ FRIEDHEIM JG. 1908 FLUCHT 1938 USA ÜBERLEBT	
Bäckerstraße 45	March 28, 2014	Kurt Friedheim (1908–?)	HIER WOHNTE KURT FRIEDHEIM JG. 1908 FLUCHT 1933 FRANKREICH MIT HILFE BEFREIT / ÜBERLEBT	
Bäckerstraße 47	March 28, 2014	Moritz Blankenberg (1872–?)	HIER WOHNTE MORITZ BLANKENBERG JG. 1872 UNFREIWILLIG VERZOGEN 1936 HANNOVER DEPORTIERT 1941 ERMORDET IN RIGA	
Bäckerstraße 47	March 28, 2014	Elise Blankenberg (1883–?)	HIER WOHNTE ELISE BLANKENBERG GEB. STEEG JG. 1883 UNFREIWILLIG VERZOGEN 1936 HANNOVER DEPORTIERT 1941 ERMORDET IN RIGA	
Bäckerstraße 47	March 28, 2014	Lotte Blankenberg (1906–?)	HIER WOHNTE LOTTE BLANKENBERG VERH. ARENSBERG JG. 1906 VERZOGEN 1930 HANNOVER DEPORTIERT 1941 ERMORDET IN RIGA	
Bäckerstraße 58	March 28, 2014	Ida Oppenheimer (1864–1943)	HIER WOHNTE IDA OPPENHEIMER JG. 1864 DEPORTIERT 1942 THERESIENSTADT TOT 24.4.1943	
Pferdemarkt 8	March 28, 2014	Paula Cahn (1864–1943)	HIER WOHNTE PAULA CAHN JG. 1864 DEPORTIERT 1942 THERESIENSTADT TOT 9.12.1943	
Pferdemarkt 8	March 28, 2014	Rieka Katz (1870–?)	HIER WOHNTE RIEKA KATZ GEB. JORDAN JG. 1870 DEPORTIERT 1942 THERESIENSTADT ERMORDET IN TREBLINKA	
Pferdemarkt 8	March 28, 2014	Karl Katz (1905–?)	HIER WOHNTE KARL KATZ JG. 1905 FLUCHT 1937 USA ÜBERLEBT	
Pferdemarkt 8	March 28, 2014	Walter Katz (1904–1939)	HIER WOHNTE WALTER KATZ JG. 1904 „SCHUTZHAFT“ 1938 BUCHENWALD ERMORDET 7.1.1939	
Fischpfortenstraße 18	January 29, 2015	Martha Cohn (1895–?)	HIER WOHNTE MARTHA COHN JG. 1895 DEPORTIERT 1942 GHETTO WARSCHAU ERMORDET	
Osterstraße 5	January 29, 2015	Henriette Herz (1867–1942)	HIER WOHNTE HENRIETTE HERZ GEB. JORDAN JG. 1867 DEPORTIERT 1942 THERESIENSTADT ERMORDET 26.9.1942 TREBLINKA	
Osterstraße 7	January 29, 2015	Ida Weinberg (1877–?)	HIER WOHNTE IDA WEINBERG GEB. NEUBURG JG. 1877 DEPORTIERT 1942 GHETTO WARSCHAU ERMORDET	
Osterstraße 7	January 29, 2015	Johanne Michaelis (1871–1943)	HIER WOHNTE JOHANNE MICHAELIS JG. 1871 DEPORTIERT 1942 THERESIENSTADT ERMORDET 16.2.1943	
Osterstraße 13	January 29, 2015	Moses Moritz Marcus (1878–1944)	HIER WOHNTE MOSES MORITZ MARCUS JG. 1878 UNFREIWILLIG VERZOGEN 1935 HAMBURG DEPORTIERT 1942 THERESIENSTADT ERMORDET 1944 AUSCHWITZ	
Osterstraße 13	January 29, 2015	Erna Marcus (1883–1944)	HIER WOHNTE ERNA MARCUS GEB. LEHMANN JG. 1883 UNFREIWILLIG VERZOGEN 1935 HAMBURG DEPORTIERT 1942 THERESIENSTADT ERMORDET 1944 AUSCHWITZ	
Osterstraße 13	January 29, 2015	Ruth Marcus (1907–?)	HIER WOHNTE RUTH MARCUS VERH. HESSE JG. 1907 FLUCHT 1939 USA	
Osterstraße 36	January 29, 2015	Helene Bloch (1879–1942)	HIER WOHNTE HELENE BLOCH JG. 1879 UNFREIWILLIG VERZOGEN 1937 VECHTA DEPORTIERT 1941 MINSK ERMORDET 28.7.1942	
Osterstraße 36	January 29, 2015	Meta Bloch (1881–1942)	HIER WOHNTE META BLOCH JG. 1881 UNFREIWILLIG VERZOGEN 1937 VECHTA DEPORTIERT 1941 MINSK ERMORDET 28.7.1942	
Osterstraße 36	January 29, 2015	Georg Reichmann (1886–1945)	HIER WOHNTE GEORG REICHMANN JG. 1886 ’SCHUTZHAFT’ 1941 GEFÄNGNIS HAMELN GESTAPO-LAGER LIEBENAU DEPORTIERT 1941 RIGA 1944 STUTTHOF 1944 BUCHENWALD ERMORDET 17.3.1945	
Neue Marktstraße 13	January 29, 2015	Selma Frankenstein (1869–?)	HIER WOHNTE SELMA FRANKENSTEIN JG. 1869 DEPORTIERT 1942 THERESIENSTADT 1942 TREBLINKA ERMORDET	
Neue Marktstraße 13	January 29, 2015	Emilie Frankenstein (1870–1965)	HIER WOHNTE EMILIE FRANKENSTEIN GEB. HESS JG. 1870 FLUCHT 1941 USA	
Neue Marktstraße 13	January 29, 2015	Charlotte Frankenstein (1906–?)	HIER WOHNTE CHARLOTTE FRANKENSTEIN JG. 1906 FLUCHT 1941 USA	
Neue Marktstraße 13	January 29, 2015	Ilse Frankenstein (1909–?)	HIER WOHNTE ILSE FRANKENSTEIN VERH. SANDER JG. 1909 FLUCHT 1938 USA	
Neue Marktstraße 13	January 29, 2015	Werner Frankenstein (1911–1999)	HIER WOHNTE WERNER FRANKENSTEIN JG. 1911 IM WIDERSTAND ’SCHUTZHAFT’ 1933 GEFÄNGNIS HAMELN FLUCHT 1933 PALÄSTINA	
164er Ring 35	January 29, 2015	Moritz Hohenstein (1876–?)	HIER WOHNTE MORITZ HOHENSTEIN JG. 1876 DEPORTIERT 1942 GHETTO WARSCHAU ERMORDET	
164er Ring 35	January 29, 2015	Bertha Hohenstein (1878–?)	HIER WOHNTE BERTHA HOHENSTEIN GEB. OPPENHEIMER JG. 1878 DEPORTIERT 1942 GHETTO WARSCHAU ERMORDET	
164er Ring 35	January 29, 2015	Ilse Hohenstein (1906–?)	HIER WOHNTE ILSE HOHENSTEIN VERH. LIMBACH JG. 1906 FLUCHT 1939 USA	
Domeierstraße 22	April 19, 2016	Adele Löwenstein (1875–?)	HIER WOHNTE ADELE LÖWENSTEIN JG. 1875 DEPORTIERT 1942 GHETTO WARSCHAU ERMORDET	
Domeierstraße 22	April 19, 2016	Selma Löwenstein (1879–?)	HIER WOHNTE SELMA LÖWENSTEIN JG. 1879 DEPORTIERT 1942 GHETTO WARSCHAU ERMORDET	
Erichstraße 1	April 19, 2016	Adolf Englender (1891–1942)	HIER WOHNTE ADOLF ENGLENDER JG. 1891 VERHAFTET 1939 GEFÄNGNIS HANNOVER 1939 BUCHENWALD DEPORTIERT 1942 AUSCHWITZ ERMORDET 31.10.1942	
Ritterstraße 1	April 19, 2016	Salomon Keyser (1857–1943)	HIER WOHNTE SALOMON KEYSER JG. 1857 FLUCHT 1939 HOLLAND INTERNIERT WESTERBORK TOT 9.5.1943	
Ritterstraße 1	April 19, 2016	Emma Keyser (1865–1943)	HIER WOHNTE EMMA KEYSER GEB. GOLDMANN JG. 1865 FLUCHT 1939 HOLLAND INTERNIERT WESTERBORK DEPORTIERT 1943 SOBIBOR ERMORDET 23.7.1943	
Ritterstraße 1	April 19, 2016	Rosa Schenk (1893–1942)	HIER WOHNTE ROSA SCHENK GEB. KEYSER JG. 1893 FLUCHT 1937 HOLLAND INTERNIERT WESTERBORK DEPORTIERT 1942 AUSCHWITZ ERMORDET 5.10.1942	
Ritterstraße 1	April 19, 2016	Leon Schenk (1889–1942)	HIER WOHNTE LEON SCHENK JG. 1889 FLUCHT 1937 HOLLAND INTERNIERT WESTERBORK DEPORTIERT 1942 AUSCHWITZ ERMORDET 5.10.1942	
Ritterstraße 1	April 19, 2016	Walter Schenk (1921–1943)	HIER WOHNTE WALTER SCHENK JG. 1921 FLUCHT 1937 HOLLAND VERHAFTET / DEPORTIERT ZWANGSARBEITERLAGER SCHOPPINITZ ERMORDET 31.10.1943	
Ritterstraße 1	April 19, 2016	Herbert Schenk (1927–1943)	HIER WOHNTE HERBERT SCHENK JG. 1927 FLUCHT 1937 HOLLAND VERHAFTET / DEPORTIERT ZWANGSARBEITERLAGER SCHOPPINITZ ERMORDET 31.10.1943	
Ritterstraße 1	April 19, 2016	Frieda Schenk (1895–?)	HIER WOHNTE FRIEDA SCHENK GEB. KEYSER JG. 1895 FLUCHT 1934 HOLLAND MIT HILFE ÜBERLEBT	
Ritterstraße 1	April 19, 2016	Elisabeth Schenk (1921–1943)	HIER WOHNTE ELIZABETH SCHENK JG. 1921 FLUCHT 1934 HOLLAND INTERNIERT WESTERBORK DEPORTIERT AUSCHWITZ ERMORDET 14.9.1943	
Ritterstraße 1	April 19, 2016	Berta Keyser (1906–1944)	HIER WOHNTE BERTA KEYSER JG. 1906 FLUCHT 1939 HOLLAND INTERNIERT WESTERBORK DEPORTIERT 1944 AUSCHWITZ ERMORDET 28.1.1944	
Emmernstraße 28	April 19, 2016	Bertha Hammerschlag (1866–1943)	HIER WOHNTE BERTHA HAMMERSCHLAG GEB. HAAS JG. 1866 DEPORTIERT 1942 THERESIENSTADT ERMORDET 1.1.1943	
Emmernstraße 28	April 19, 2016	Hermann Hammerschlag (1897–?)	HIER WOHNTE HERMANN HAMMERSCHLAG JG. 1897 ’SCHUTZHAFT’ 1938 BUCHENWALD DEPORTIERT 1942 GHETTO WARSCHAU ERMORDET	
Emmernstraße 28	April 19, 2016	Bianka Hammerschlag (1905–?)	HIER WOHNTE BIANKA HAMMERSCHLAG GEB. NOCHEM JG. 1905 DEPORTIERT 1942 GHETTO WARSCHAU ERMORDET	
Emmernstraße 28	April 19, 2016	Helene Dina Hammerschlag (1936–?)	HIER WOHNTE HELENE DINA HAMMERSCHLAG JG. 1936 DEPORTIERT 1942 GHETTO WARSCHAU ERMORDET	
Großehofstraße 17	April 19, 2016	Elias Birnbaum (1863–1940)	HIER WOHNTE ELIAS BIRNBAUM JG. 1863 GEDEMÜTIGT / ENTRECHTET TOT 14.7.1940	
Großehofstraße 17	April 19, 2016	Henrietta Birnbaum (1872–1947)	HIER WOHNTE JETTCHEN BIRNBAUM GEB. HEILBRUNN JG. 1872 DEPORTIERT 1942 THERESIENSTADT 5.2.1945 FREIHEITSTRANSPORT SCHWEIZ	
Königstraße 2	April 19, 2016	Salomon Szaja Kamenetzky (1886–?)	HIER WOHNTE SALOMON SZAJA KAMENETZKY JG. 1886 ’POLENAKTION’ 1938 BENTSCHEN / ZBASZYN ERMORDET IM BESETZTEN POLEN	
Königstraße 2	April 19, 2016	Henriette Kamenetzky (1895–?)	HIER WOHNTE HENRIETTE KAMENETZKY GEB. LÖWENSTEIN JG. 1895 ’POLENAKTION’ 1938 BENTSCHEN / ZBASZYN ERMORDET IM BESETZTEN POLEN	
Königstraße 2	April 19, 2016	Eva Kamenetzky (1928–?)	HIER WOHNTE EVA KAMENETZKY JG. 1928 ’POLENAKTION’ 1938 BENTSCHEN / ZBASZYN ERMORDET IM BESETZTEN POLEN	
Königstraße 2	April 19, 2016	Hermann Kamenetzky (1920–?)	HIER WOHNTE HERMANN KAMENETZKY JG. 1920 FLUCHT 1935 PALÄSTINA	

== See also ==
- New Synagogue (Hamelin)
- History of the Jews in Hamelin
