= History of the Jews in Hamelin =

Jewish heritage of Hamelin, Germany

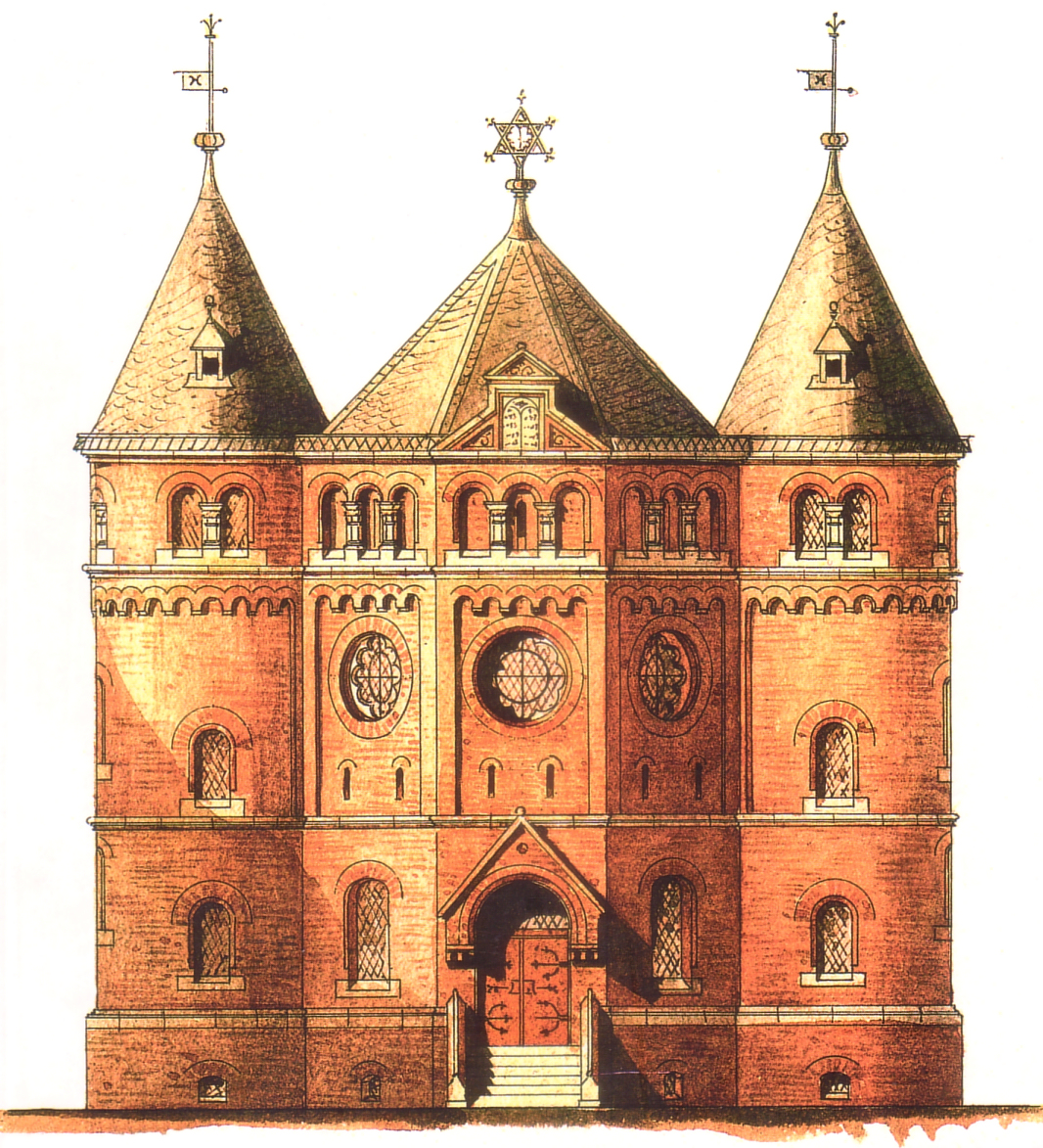
The Old Synagogue in Hamelin from 1879 as a design drawing by Edwin Oppler

The history of the Jews in Hamelin begins with their first documentary mention in 1277, after the founding of the city of Hamelin around the year 1200. In the following centuries, Jews made up to six percent of the city's population.

In 1879, the Jewish community built a synagogue, which was destroyed in the November pogrom of 1938. During the period of National Socialism, 101 Jewish residents were deported and murdered. Today, memorial stones commemorate them.

Since the 1990s, Jewish life has been re-established in Hamelin through the founding of two Jewish communities and the construction of the New Synagogue. In the city there is the Jewish Cemetery, also desecrated in 1938 during the November pogrom. The burial site was restored in 1945 and has been reoccupied since the 1990s.

== History ==
=== The Middle Ages ===
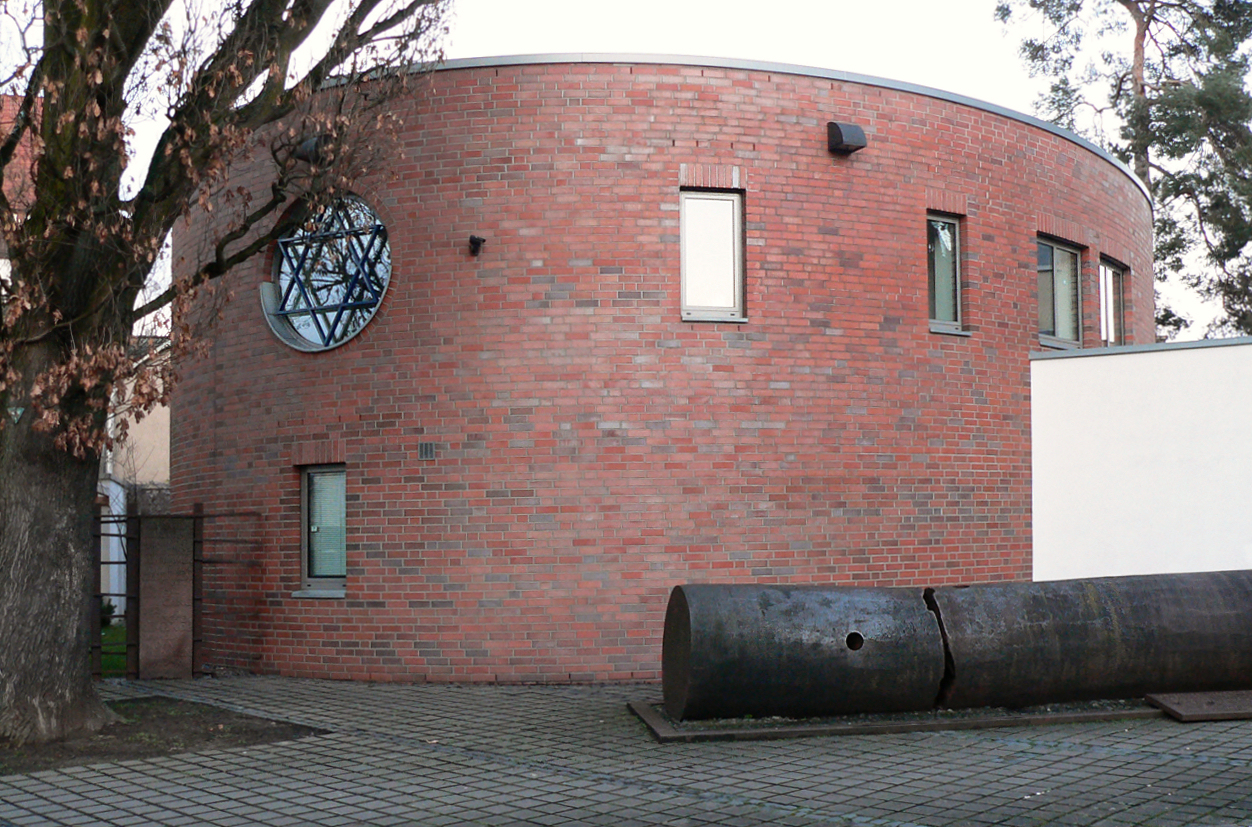
The New Hamelin Synagogue, built in 2011

The city of Hamelin was founded around the year 1200, and Jews were first mentioned in documents in 1277. In other cities of today's Lower Saxony, Jewish populations have been documented since the 13th century, such as in Helmstedt (1240), Hannover (1292) and Braunschweig (1296). The first mention of the Jews of Hamelin is found in the great city privilege of 1277, with which Duke Albrecht I of the city of Hamelin confirmed extensive freedoms and rights. In this privilege, the Duke left the licensing of Jewish businesses to the city and thus provided an important source of finance.

Every Jew living in Hamelin was thus freed from all duties to the Duke, but obliged to the city to the "services of a citizen", such as guard duty and fortification work. In this way the Jews enjoyed the city's protection, but they had to pay for it.

In 1344, there were 20 adult male Jews among the town's population of about 2,000. When their household members, such as women and children, are included, this gives a figure of 120 Jews, or 6 percent of the population. Unlike many other cities, Hamelin had no enclosed Jewish quarter.

=== Modern times ===
The city council was interested in Jewish citizens because as merchants they stimulated the economy. No restrictive measures have been adopted against them. At the end of the 16th century, the city of Hamelin was affected by the broader wave of Jewish expulsions across the region. Nevertheless, Jews left the city; in 1596, only one Schutzjude (a Jew granted official protected status) and his family of seven lived in the city.

Toward the end of the 17th century, the number of Jewish citizens increased again. In 1689 four Jewish families with 37 people lived in the city, which at 2632 city residents constitutes a population share of 1.4 percent. In the 18th century, the Jewish population continued to grow; in 1792 there were 14 families. The instructions of Hanoverian authorities increasingly restricted Jewish merchants, so that the majority of Jews lived in social isolation and poverty. In 1797, the 13 "Schutzjude" Jews living in Hamelin petitioned the government in Hanover in vain for the granting of civil rights.

=== 19th and 20th centuries ===
In the French period at the beginning of the 19th century, Jews were legally equal to the rest of the population in Hamelin. After the victory over Napoleon, the Kingdom of Hanover abolished the equality of the Jews again after the Congress of Vienna in 1815. Taken over from the French period, in 1828 the regulation was that Jews had to have fixed family names.

It was not until 1842 that the legal situation of the Jews improved with the Hanoverian Law on the Legal Relationships of the Jews, which was based on the liberal Jewish legislation in Prussia with the Prussian Jewish Edict of 1812. Full legal equality was granted to the Jews only after the revolution of 1848 by an amendment to the constitution of the Kingdom of Hanover. At that time, 86 Jews lived among Hamelin's 6,400 inhabitants. With an influx from the surrounding villages, their numbers increased, reaching 129 persons in 1864.

After the annexation of the Kingdom of Hanover, Hamelin also belonged to Prussia from 1866; thereafter, Jews in the favorably developing city quickly achieved professional and social advancement. There were Jewish entrepreneurs in the carpet industry as well as Jewish doctors and lawyers.

Most Jews were patriotic and prayed in the synagogue for the emperor and the empire. Nevertheless, toward the end of the 19th century, they faced increasing anti-Semitism. At the beginning of the First World War, numerous Jews from Hamelin volunteered for military service. After the war, they founded a local group of the Reichsbund of Jewish front soldiers in Hamelin, which included 30 members.

In the conservative Jewish community of Hamelin, around 1920, there was a small local Zionist group, which included the lawyer Ernst Katzenstein and the dentist Hermann Gradnauer. Gradnauer initiated in 1926 the kibbutz Cheruth in the Hamelin area, oriented to Zionist and socialist ideals, which served to prepare (Hakhshara) young people for their immigration (Aliya) to Palestine.

=== The period of National Socialism ===
During the period of National Socialism, 101 persons of Jewish origin who lived or were born in Hamelin were murdered after their deportation. At the time of the seizure of power in 1933, 160 of Hamelin's 20,000 inhabitants belonged to the Jewish community, a population share of 0.8 percent. The number of parishioners dropped to 44 in 1939. At that time, only two members of the community had income from employment as merchants, while the rest lived on savings, pensions or rental income.

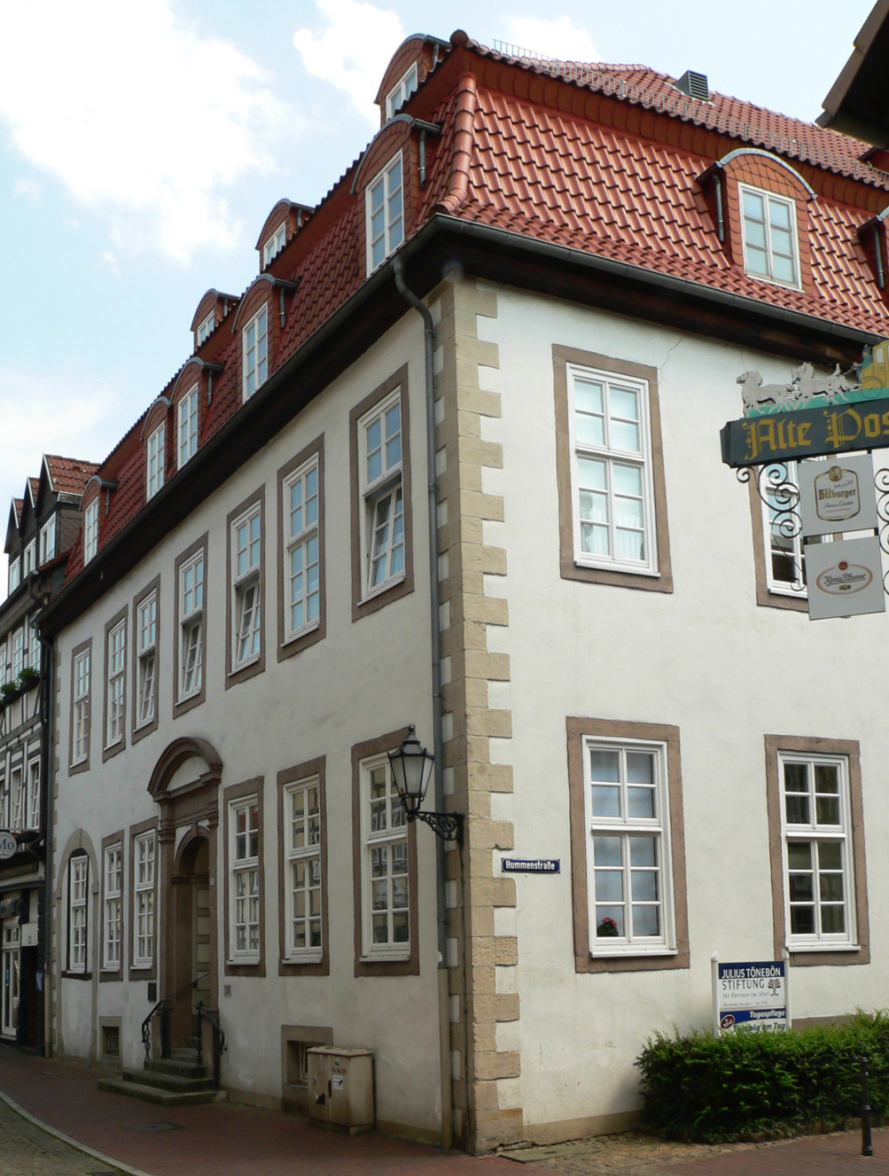
Hamelin Neue Marktstrasse 13

A first attack occurred on March 6, 1933 as an attempted arson at the Old Synagogue with burning gasoline canisters. On March 13, 1933, for the first time, SA men stood in front of Jewish shops with signs calling for a boycott. On April 1, 1933, as in all of Germany, boycott measures against Jewish shops were taken in Hamelin. The local Deister and Weser newspaper published the boycott call as an advertisement, naming 29 Jewish shops, doctors and lawyers.

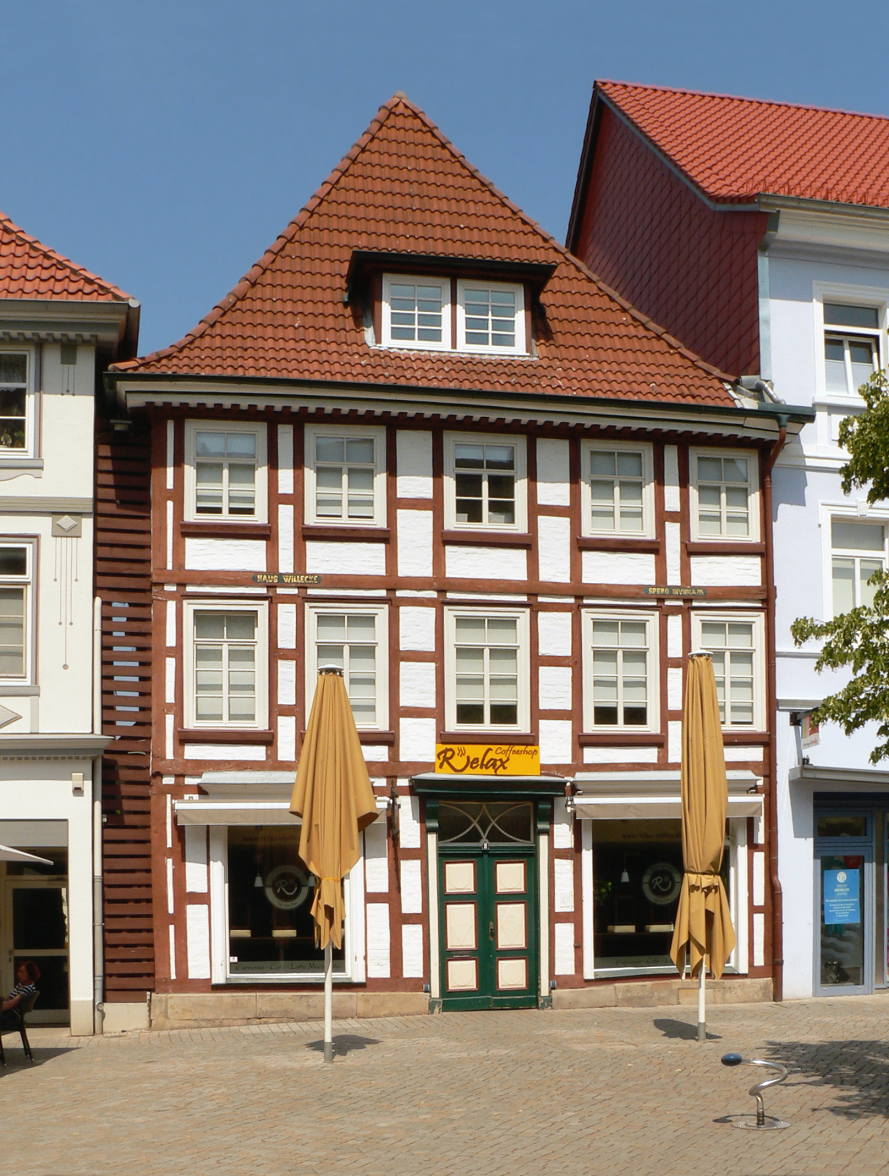
Former Jewish house at Pferdemarkt 8

During the November pogrom of 1938, men of the Hamel SA and SS, with the help of firefighters, set fire to the Old Synagogue, while the neighboring houses were protected by the fire brigade. The Jewish cemetery was desecrated by overturning and smashing tombstones. On the same day, Jewish-owned shops in Hamelin were also looted. 10 Jewish men were taken into protective custody in the city and taken to Buchenwald Concentration Camp.

Following the law on rental relations with Jews, which was passed in April 1939, the Hameliner city administration began relocating Jewish tenants in October 1939. About six months later, the conversions to two Jewish homes were completed. Seventeen Jewish people entered the Neue Marktstraße 13 building and five Jewish women entered the Pferdemarkt 8 building.

The Jewish inhabitants were deported in two transports: First, 14 people arrived in the Warsaw Ghetto at the end of March 1942. Another 13 people, all over the age of 65, were taken to the Theresienstadt Ghetto in July 1942.

=== Former synagogues ===
A first synagogue in Hamelin already existed in 1341, whose location can no longer be located. It was a stone house with a courtyard and two booths rented by the city. From the 17th century, a rented room with Mikveh in a now demolished house in the Old Market Street served as a synagogue. By the 19th century, this no longer suited the space and representation needs of the larger and more prosperous Jewish community.

In 1875, the city of Hamelin offered the Jewish community the empty garrison church for the establishment of a synagogue for purchase. Evangelical ministers then created an anti-Jewish climate. Eventually, the city sold the Jewish community a plot of land in the Bürenstraße. In 1878/1879 the Old Synagogue Hamelin was built according to plans by the architect Edwin Oppler as a monumental building in the neo-Romanesque style, which provided space for 300 worshippers.

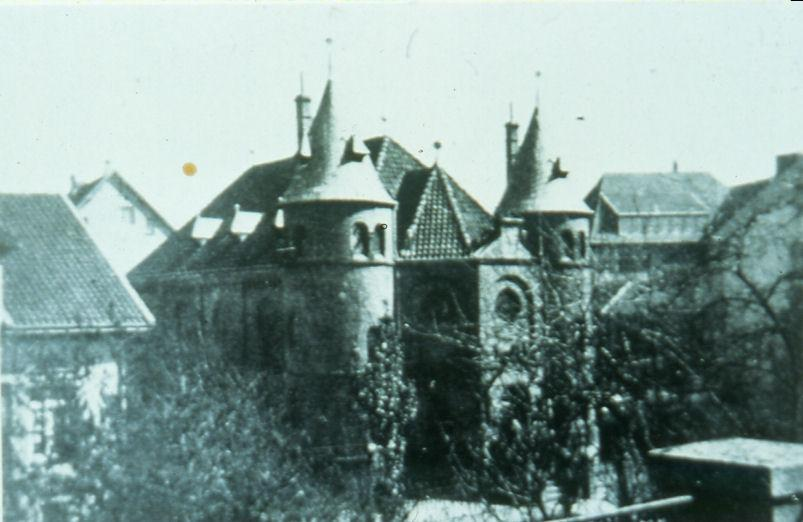
Hamelin Alte Synagoge

During the November pogrom of 1938, the synagogue was set on fire by SA and SS members. Shortly thereafter, the city ordered the removal of the fire debris. As late as 1938, the city purchased the synagogue's property. She reduced the purchase price in the first offer from 9800 to 6000 Reichsmark, although the unit value was 32,500 Reichsmark. The plot, on which a building had remained, was first used as a vegetable garden after 1938. After the Second World War, there were already efforts in 1945 to dignify the square with a memorial plaque, which was fruitless. In 1951, the Jewish Trust Corporation raised claims for restitution or compensation of the synagogue land, which was paid by the city of Hamelin with about 14,000 DM.

== Place of commemoration ==
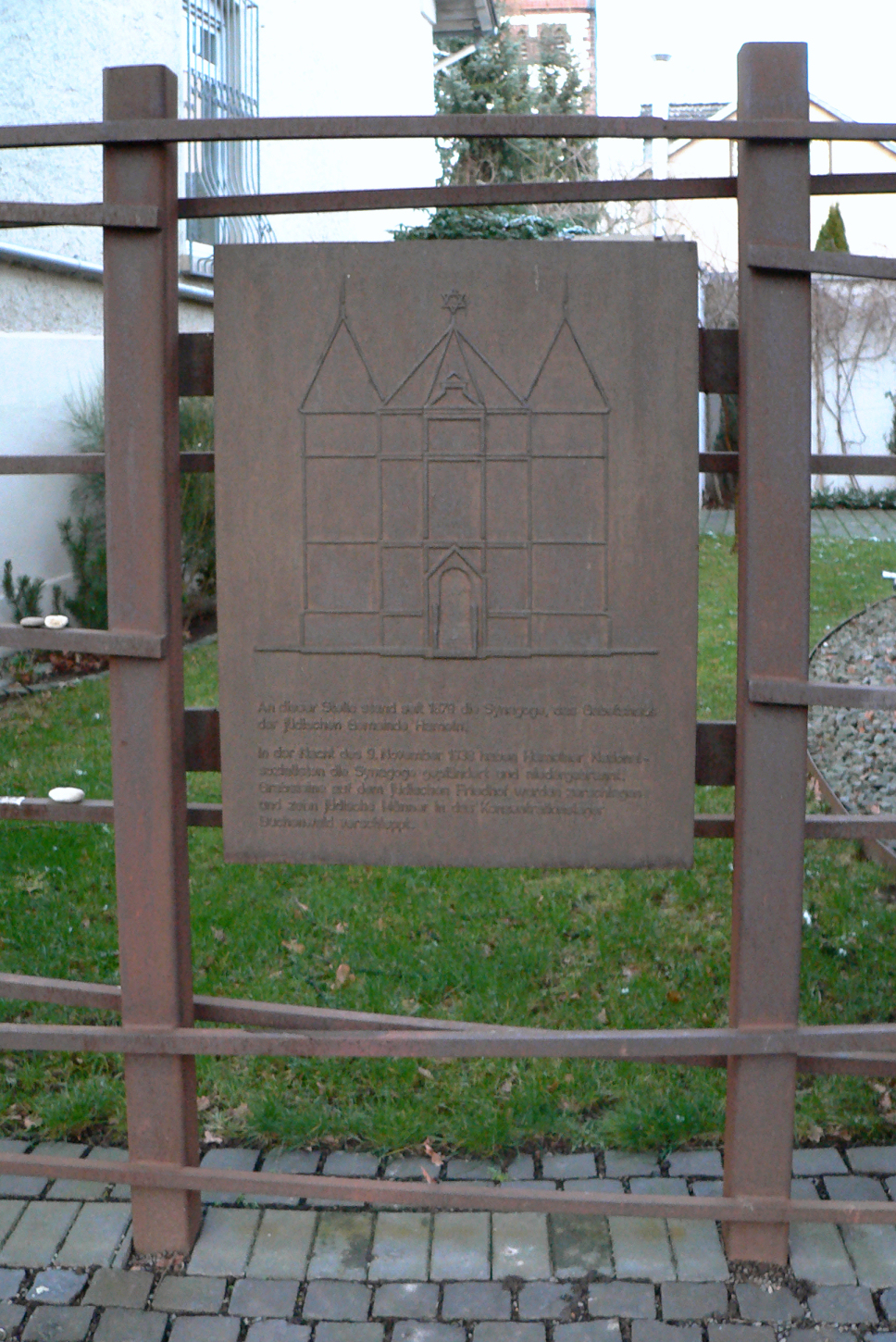
Memorial plaque to the Old Synagogue in Hamelin

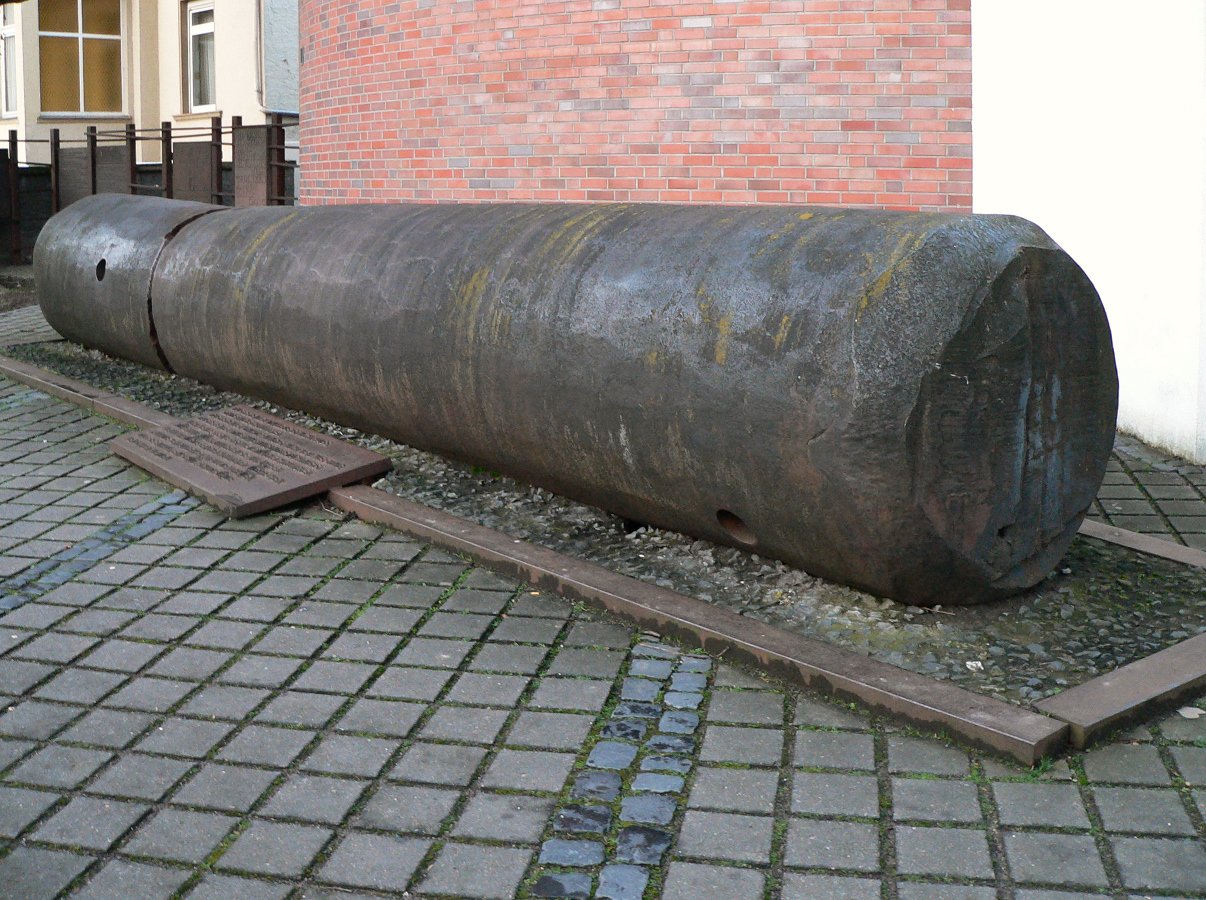
Broken steel column of the memorial

After 1945, the city had a children's playground set up on the former synagogue grounds, at the edge of which a small memorial with a memorial stone enclosed by a beech hedge was inaugurated in 1963. It bears the inscription "People are silent - stones always talk. In 1978 or 1980, the site was enclosed by a wall clad in sandstone. In 1980, the Bürenstraße at the height of the former synagogue grounds and the memorial was named "Synagogenplatz". From 1995, citizens called for a redesign of the memorial. For the 1996 remodeling carried out by donations and financial resources of the city, the sculptor Hans-Jürgen Breuste created a two-part memorial. On the one hand, it consists of five nameplates, listing 99 victims from Hamelin by name, age, and the circumstances of their deportation and death. On the other hand, a tall, fractured steel column symbolizes the events of that time.

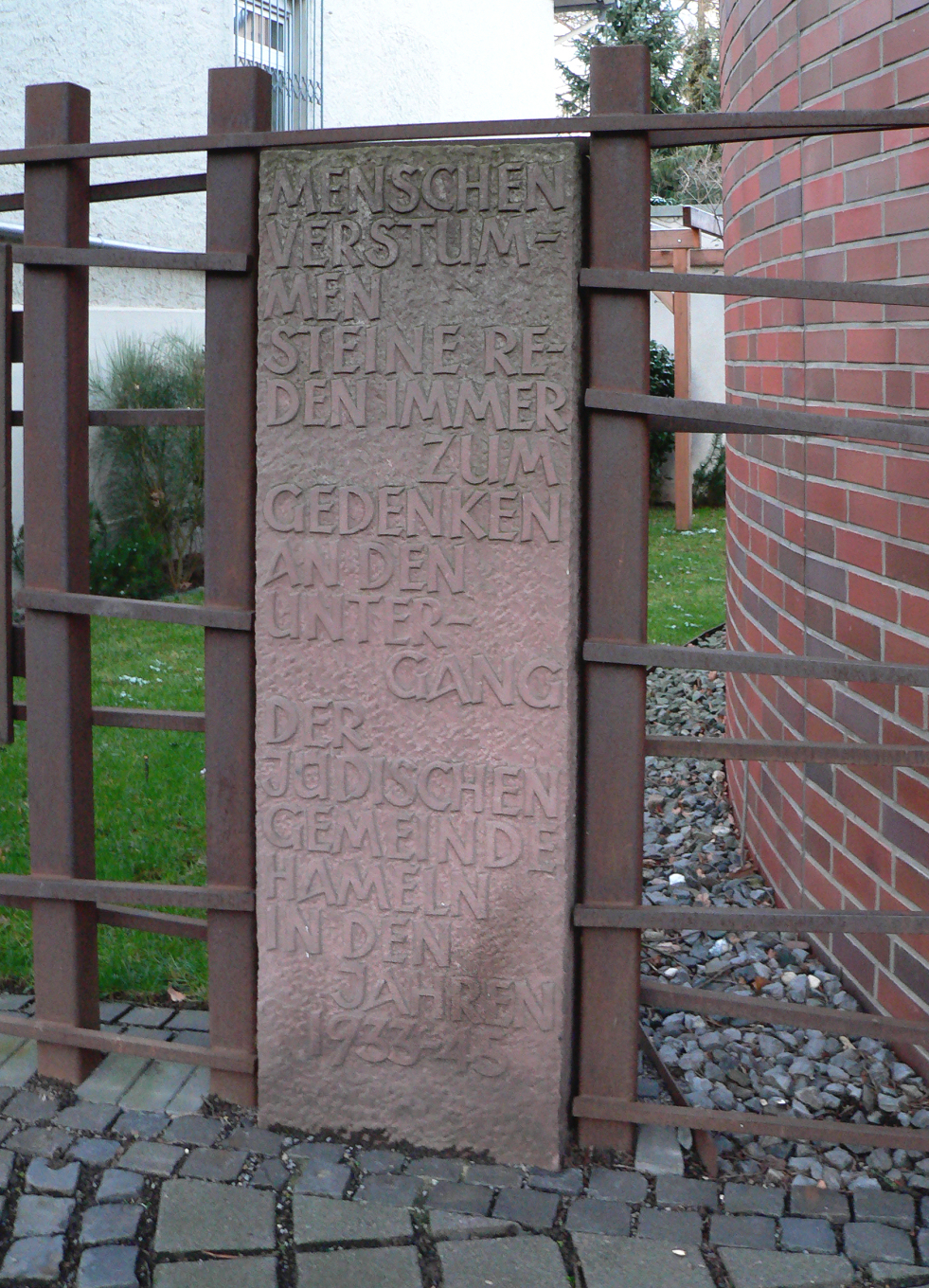
Memorial stone from 1963, which was included in the memorial that was redesigned in 1996

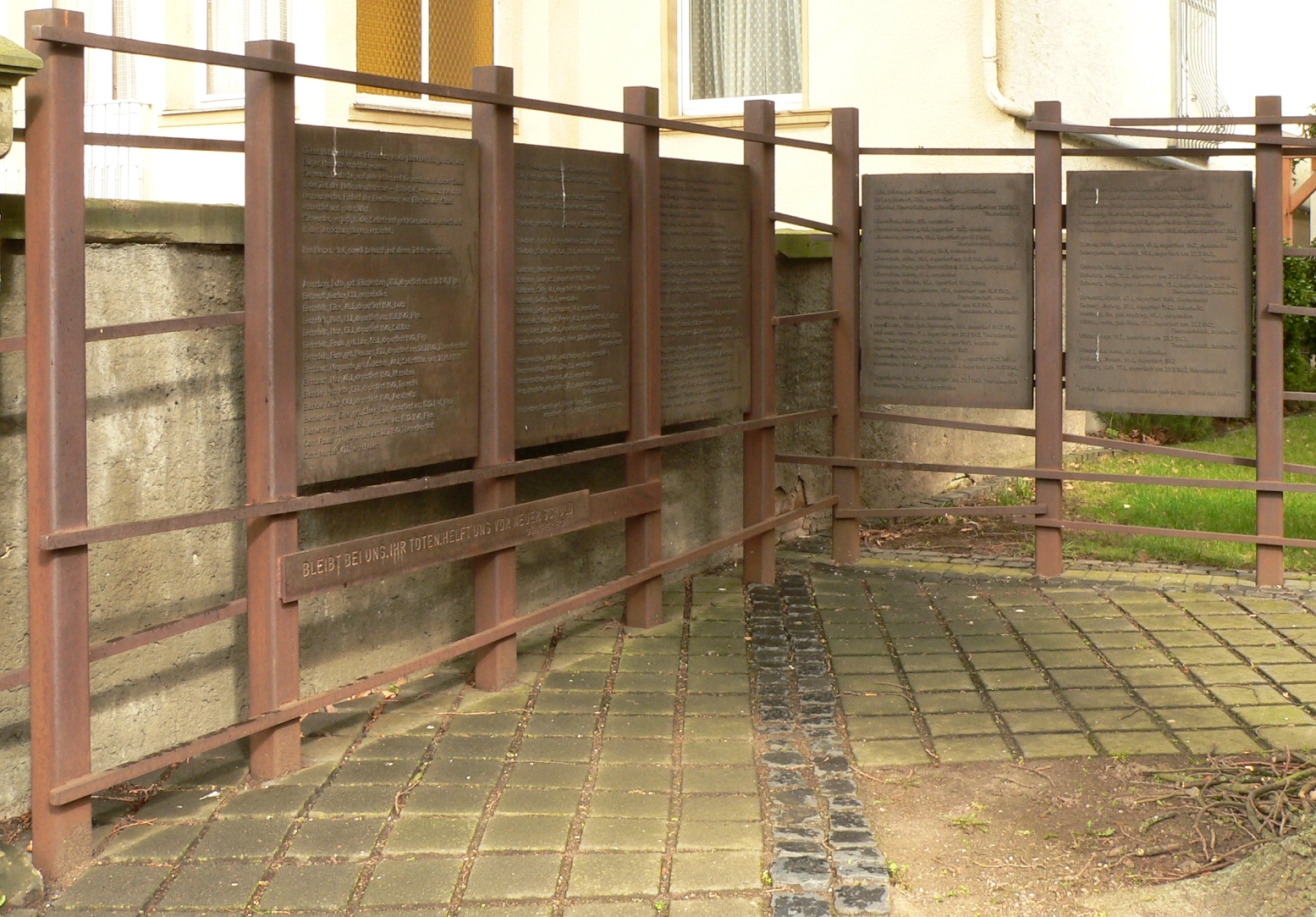
Five name plaques with the deportation fates of 99 people from Hamelin

== Building of new synagogues ==
In 2001, the Liberal Jewish Community (de) of Hamelin acquired the former synagogue site and built the New Synagogue there, which was inaugurated in 2011. It is a red brick building with an oval floor plan and two floors. A round window on the upper floor shows a Star of David. The building was named "Beitenu" (lit. Our House) by the congregation members. It is the first new construction of a liberal synagogue in Germany since 1945. The cost amounted to one million euros and was borne by one third each of the state of Lower Saxony, the city of Hamelin and the district of Hamelin-Pyrmont as well as the Jewish community. The new synagogue forms a unit with the memorial, which was redesigned in 1996.

== Cemetery ==
Main article - Jewish Cemetery, Hameln

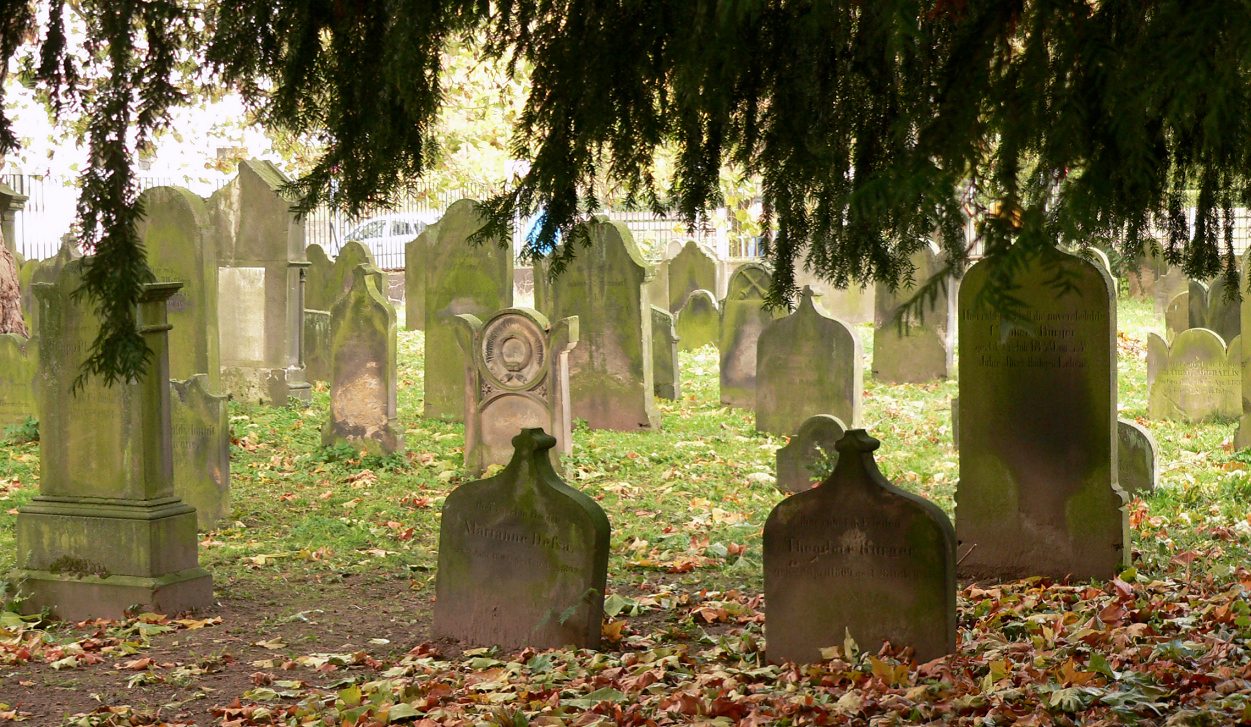
Gravestones at the Jewish Cemetery in Hamelin (2010)

Originally there was a Jewish cemetery outside the city, which had to give way to the expansion of Hamelin in the 17th century to the country fortress of the Electorate of Hanover. In 1743, the Jewish community acquired a plot of land in front of the Easter Gate for a cemetery. It was located in the middle of gardens in the foreground of the fortress grounds outside the city, on the site of today's Scharnhorststraße. As the Jewish community in Hamelin grew, the cemetery was expanded in 1879 by the purchase of a neighboring garden plot.

During the November pogrom of 1938, the cemetery was desecrated by the overthrow and smashing of tombstones. After the Second World War, the city of Hamelin had the Cemetery restored in 1946.

At the Jewish Cemetery Hamelin today there are 173 tombstones for Jewish deceased from Hamelin and the surrounding area. The oldest tombstone dates from 1741, the youngest from 1937. The former burial site is a protected cultural monument.

== Stolperstein ==
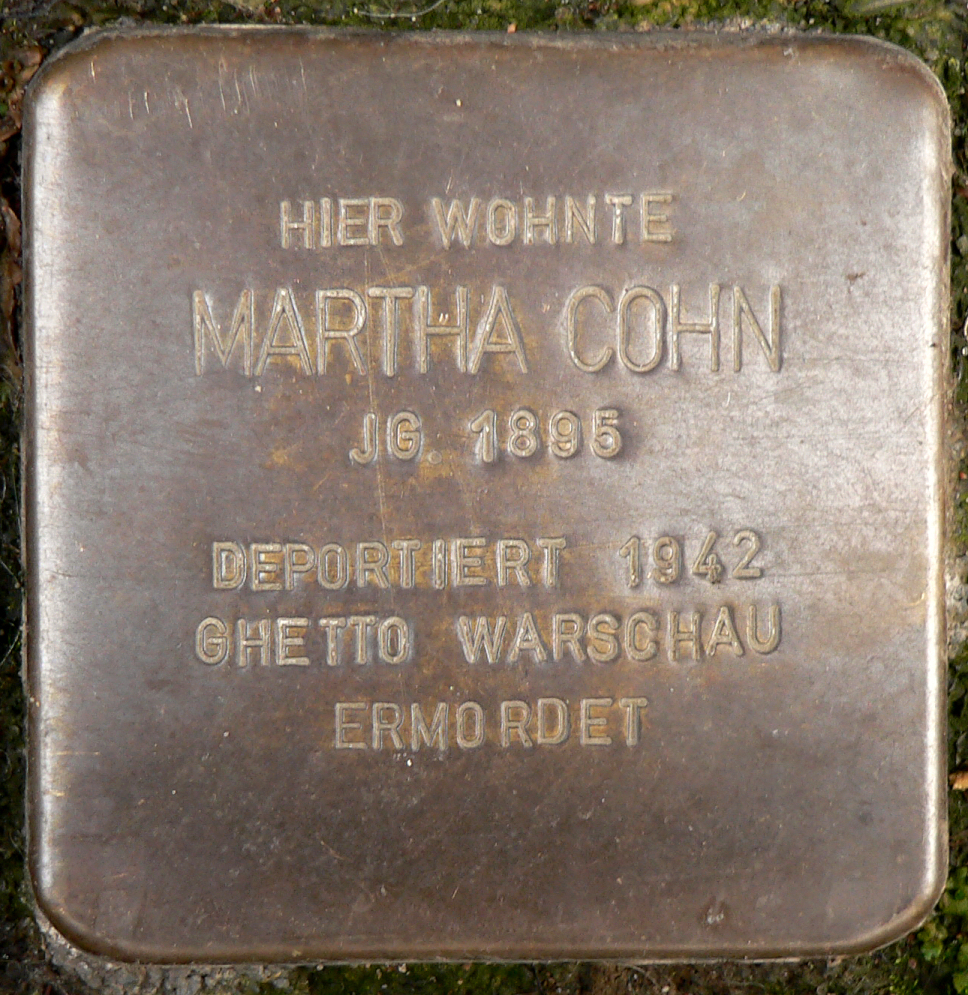
Stolperstein for Martha Cohn

Main article - List of stolperstein in Hamelin

In Hamelin, since 2013, Stolperstein have been placed as part of the action of the artist Gunter Demnig, 68 until 2018. The 10 × 10 × 10 cm concrete squares with brass panels are inserted into the sidewalk in front of the houses where the victims of the National Socialist dictatorship lived at that time. Among them is a large number of Jewish citizens.

== See also ==
- Glückel of Hameln - German-Jewish writer and businesswoman.

== Bibliography ==
- Hameln, Gluckel of; Abrahams, Beth-Zion (2010). Life of Gluckel of Hameln. Dulles: Jewish Publication Society. ISBN 978-0-8276-0914-3. OCLC 676697197. OL 26022040M.
- Gelderblom, Bernhard; Schaller, Berndt (2011). Die Juden von Hameln: von ihren Anfängen im 13. Jahrhundert bis zu ihrer Vernichtung durch das NS-Regime (in German). Holzminden: Mitzkat. ISBN 978-3-940751-39-3. OCLC 760455636.
