= Jewish Cemetery, Hamelin =

Coordinates: 52.1061°N 9.3665°E

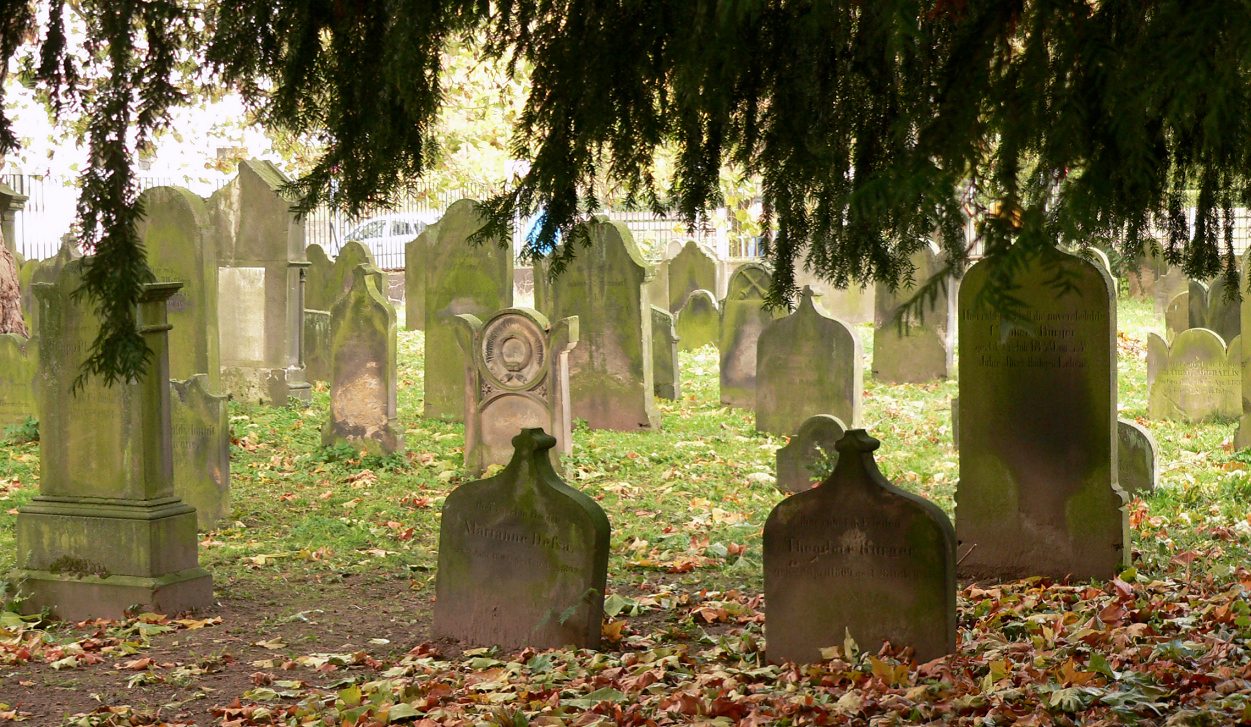
Gravestones of the Jewish cemetery in Hameln

The Jewish cemetery in Hamelin is a protected cultural monument in Hamelin, Lower Saxony, Germany.. It contains 173 gravestones for Jewish deceased from Hamelin and the surrounding area. The oldest gravestone dates from 1741.

== History ==
There was previously a cemetery in Hamelin located outside the city, which had to make way for Hamelin's expansion in the 17th century into a state fortress of the Electorate of Hanover. In the process, the gravestones were used as building material for the fortress in the area of the Minster churchyard.

In 1743, the Jewish community acquired a plot of land outside the Oster Gate for a cemetery. It was situated among gardens outside the fortress grounds, beyond the city limits. The cemetery is located today on Scharnhorststraße. Near the Jewish cemetery, the officers' cemetery ("Hamelin Garrison Cemetery") was established in 1720. In 1757, the Deister Cemetery was created in the same area.

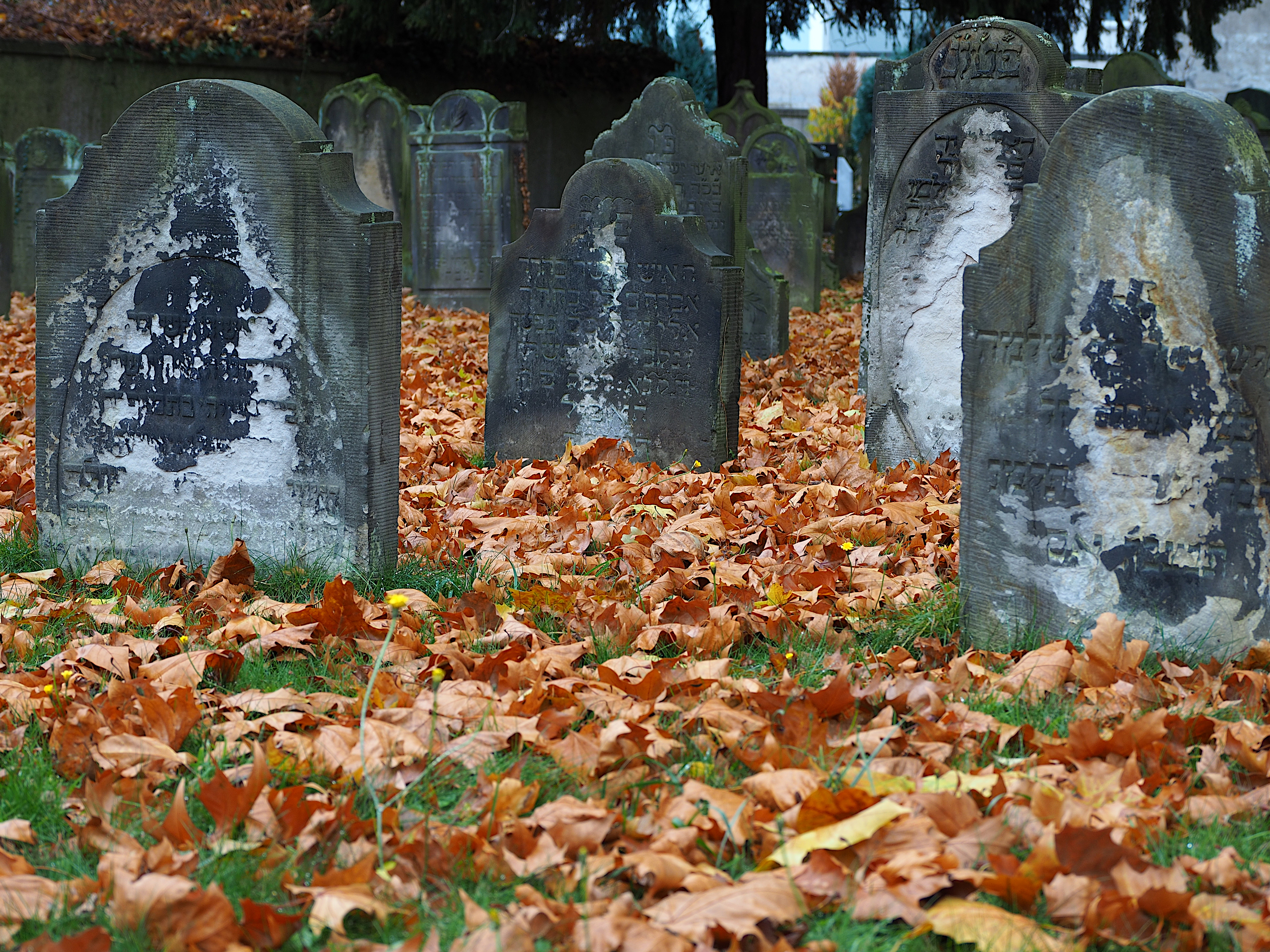

After the Jewish community in Hamelin had grown, the need arose in the late 1870s to expand the cemetery. An adjacent garden plot was acquired for this purpose, giving the cemetery its current angular shape and a size of approximately 2,100 m². In 1870, the surrounding area was still undeveloped, with construction only beginning around the turn of the century. During the Nazi era, burials became increasingly difficult. Craftsmen, fearing public exposure as "friends of Jews", refused to produce gravestones or coffins. During the November Pogrom of 1938, the cemetery was desecrated through the overturning and smashing of gravestones. The cemetery remained in that condition until 1945, during which time four more burials still took place up to 1942.

After all Jews had been deported from Hamelin, the Reich Association of Jews in Germany sought to sell the cemetery plot. The City of Hamelin offered the paltry sum of approximately 125 Reichsmarks. After the Reich Association was dissolved in 1943, ownership of the cemetery plot passed to the Regional Finance Directorate in Hanover, which leased the grounds to a Hamelin master stonemason, who acquired the gravestones for reuse.

After the war, in 1946, the city had the cemetery restored by the leaseholder, who was the person most familiar with the grounds. Since the damage was extensive and no burial plan of the cemetery existed, the reconstruction remained incomplete. Many broken gravestones were re-erected in shortened form. Around 1950, the cemetery was restituted to the Jewish Trust Corporation and in 1952 transferred to the State Association of Jewish Communities of Lower Saxony. In 1963, construction work was carried out at the cemetery, as the brick wall had fallen into disrepair. A newly erected fence allowed public view of the grounds for the first time. In 1994, the first new burial took place at the cemetery. In the late 1990s, the Jewish Cultural Community of the Hamelin-Pyrmont District took over the maintenance of the cemetery.
