= New Synagogue (Hamelin) =

Synagogue in Hamelin

Coordinates: 52°06′01″N 9°21′41″E

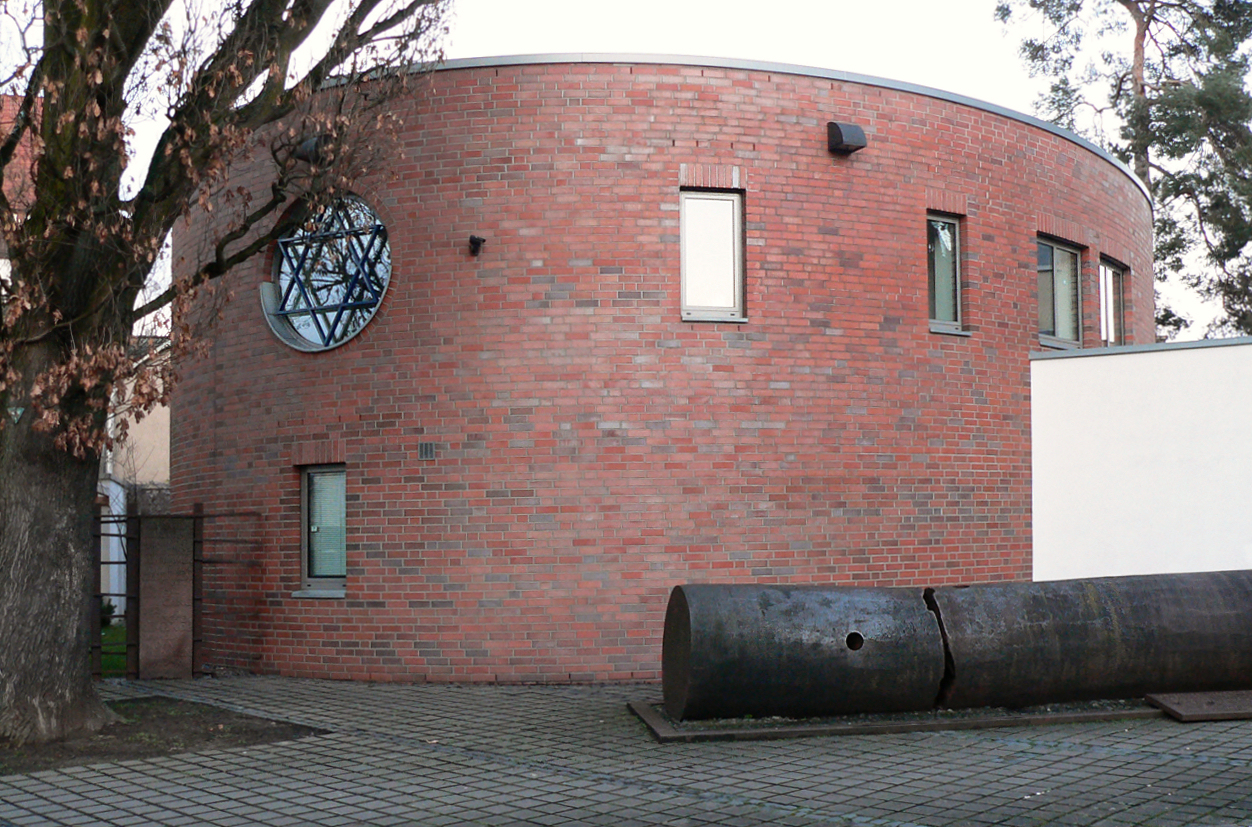
New Synagogue of Hamelin

The New Synagogue is a synagogue built in 2011 in Hamelin, a city in the Hameln-Pyrmont district of Lower Saxony, Germany.

== Description ==
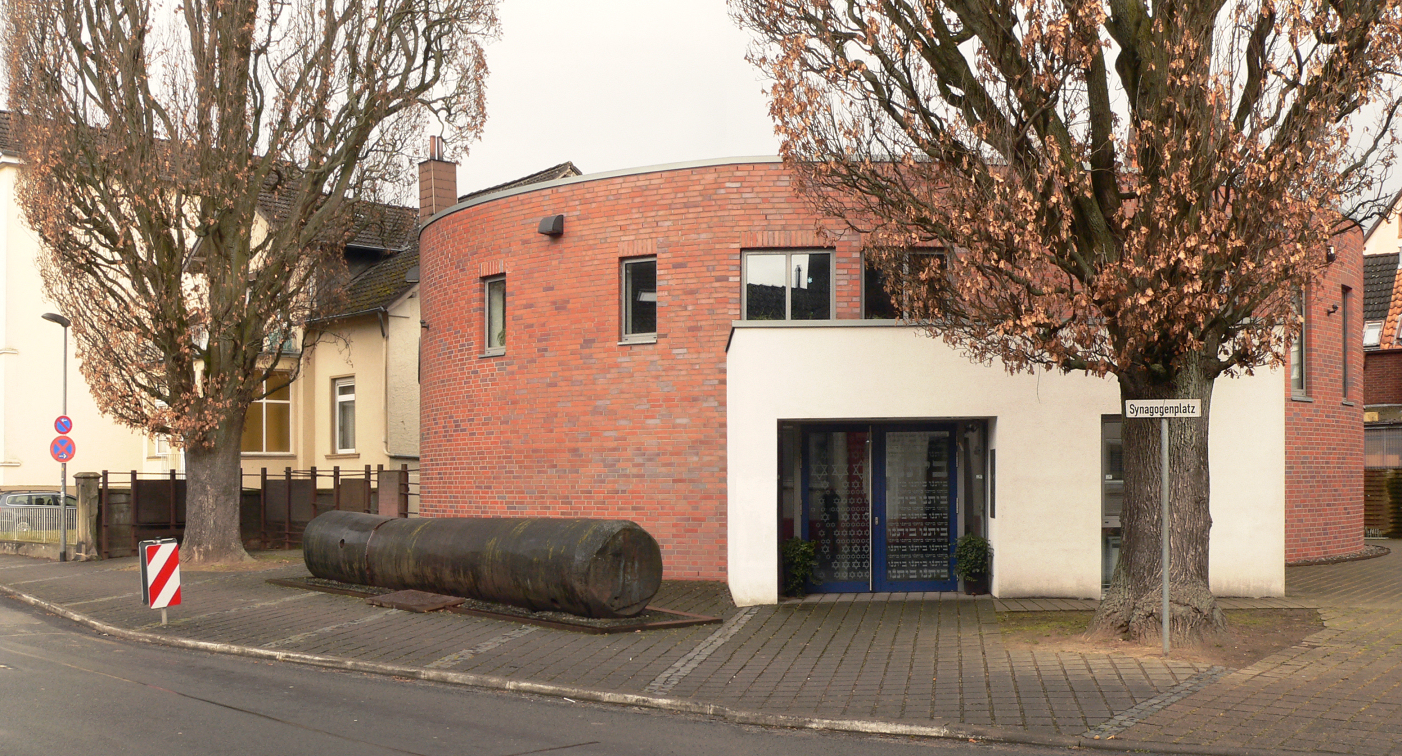
The new synagogue stands between the two pyramidal oaks between which the old synagogue also stood

The synagogue stands on the foundations of the Old Synagogue, which was built in 1878/79 and destroyed during the November Pogrom of 1938, on Bürenstraße. Two pyramidal oak trees still bear witness to this today, they were planted at the synagogue's consecration in 1879, and the new building stands between them just as the old one did. In 1980, the forecourt of the synagogue grounds on Bürenstraße was named "Synagogenplatz" (Synagogue Square). A memorial stone has stood there since 1963. In 1996, a memorial was established at the site as a two-part monument, which forms a unified whole with the synagogue.

The synagogue building is a red-brick, oval-shaped structure with two storeys. A Star of David is visible in a round window on the upper floor. The congregation named the building Beitenu (Our House). It is the first newly constructed liberal synagogue in Germany since 1945. The total cost was one million euros, funded in equal thirds by the state of Lower Saxony, the city of Hamelin and the Hameln-Pyrmont district, and the Jewish congregation.

== History ==
During the National Socialist era, 101 people of Jewish origin who lived in or were born in Hamelin were murdered. After the liberation from National Socialism in 1945, a small number of Jewish people remained in Hamelin, though they did not identify themselves publicly as Jews. Jewish life in Hamelin was thus extinguished for a long time. It was not until the late 1990s that two Jewish congregations were founded, including the Liberal Jewish Congregation of Hamelin, established in 1997. It acquired the former synagogue grounds in 2001 and built the new synagogue there in 2011, based on plans by architect Frank Taylor.

Construction began in early May 2010, when the congregation held a groundbreaking ceremony attended by the town's mayor and other city officials. At the ceremony, a non-Jewish neighbor presented the congregation with a stone she had salvaged from the rubble of the original synagogue in 1938 and preserved for over seven decades. To help fund the project, the congregation sold CDs of Shabbat melodies performed by volunteer cantor Rebekka Dohme.

=== Inauguration ===
The synagogue was inaugurated on February 20, 2011. At the ceremony, Stephan Kramer, Secretary General of the Central Council of Jews in Germany, stated that every inauguration of a new synagogue is a clear signal that the Jewish community takes its future seriously and is ready to put down roots. Lower Saxony's Minister of Culture, Bernd Althusmann, called the inauguration a historic day for the state.

== See also ==
- History of the Jews in Hamelin
