= Sources of the Rhine =

Source in Switzerland

Coordinates: 46°37′59.358″N 8°40′20.8128″E

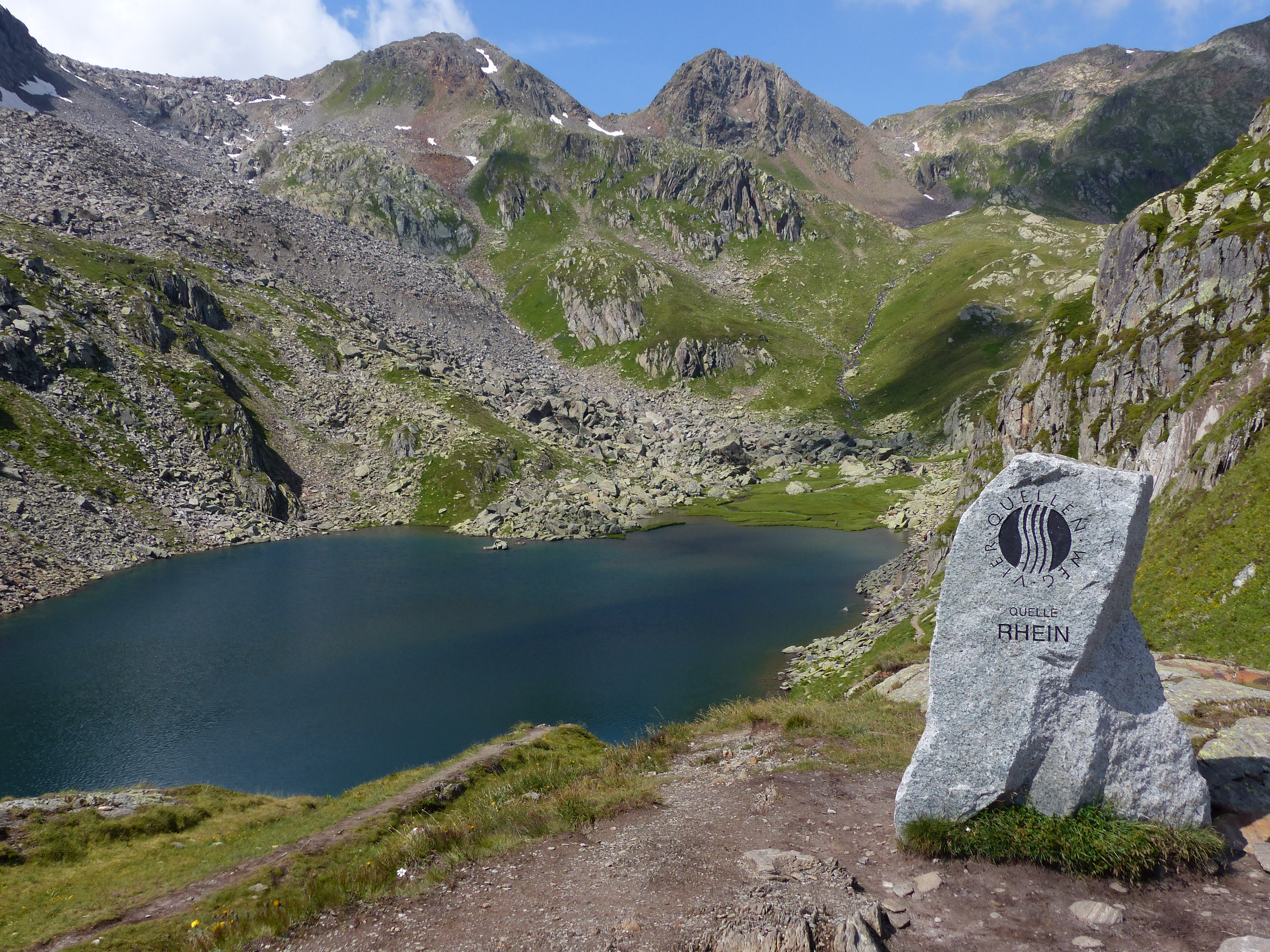
Lake Toma with memorial stone of the Rhine source (Quelle Rhein)

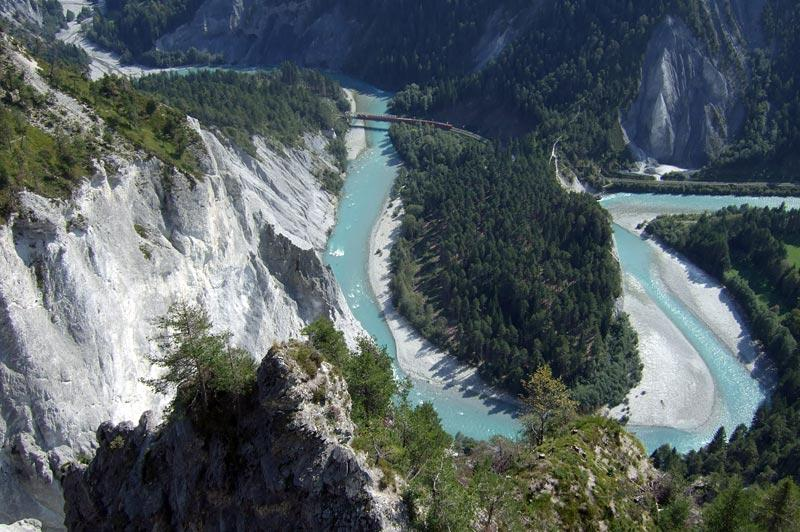
The Vorderrhein in the Ruinaulta gorge

The source of the River Rhine is generally regarded to be Lake Toma, in the Swiss canton of Grisons (Graubünden). The lake's outflow, the Rein da Tuma, subsequently becomes the Anterior Rhine (Sursilvan: Rein Anteriur; German: Vorderrhein), which later confluences with the Posterior Rhine (Sutsilvan: Ragn Posteriur; German: Hinterrhein) to form the Rhine (Alpine Rhine). Because the tributary systems of the Rhine differ only slightly in length, discharge and the size of their drainage areas, it is difficult to pinpoint a single source of this major European river.

== Criteria for distinguishing between main branches and tributaries ==
There are different criteria for the definition of tributaries, and by some definitions, irrespective of the official name, one strand or another may be called the source. Determining the source of the Rhine is difficult, because in the river system of the Anterior and Posterior Rhine, there are many headwaters of similar size. Apart from the common criterion of the (apparent or real) larger discharge, ongoing cartographic research allows us to determine the headwater with the greatest length, the largest catchment area or (occasionally) the highest source.

The direction of flow may be crucial to the nomenclature as may be the significance of the valleys as room for housing and transport. Both criteria are more appropriate to the Vorderrhein, since the Hinterrhein valley was hardly populated before the influx of the Walser people.

== Rhine sources by name ==
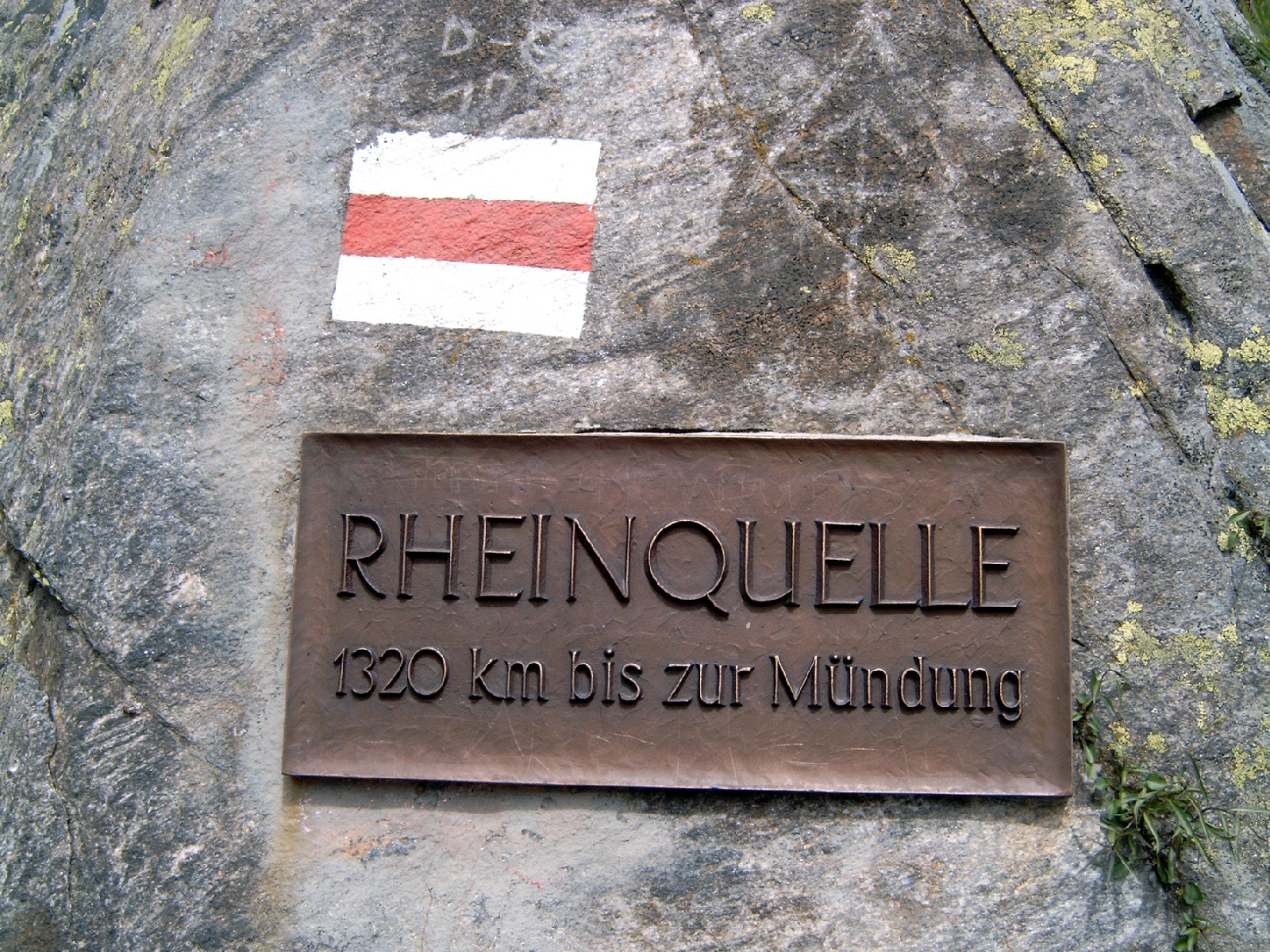
Sign "source of the Rhine" at Lake Toma, with incorrect length indication

The Swiss Federal Office of Topography and ETH Zürich indicate a point north of Lake Toma and the Rein da Tuma as the source of the Rhine (and also of the Vorderrhein), and as the source of the Hinterrhein a point in the upper valley of the Rheinwald, east of the Rheinwaldhorn.

The course of the Rein da Tuma, after leaving Lake Toma, is not particularly representative: after about 2 km (1.2 mi), its water is diverted into Curnera reservoir. The water is released at the Tavanase plant and flows into the Vorderrhein at Ilanz. The river begins to be called the Rhine further downstream at the confluence of the Vorderrhein and Hinterrhein near Reichenau and Tamins.

In the area of the headwaters of the Rhine, the term Rhine is used as part of the name of many rivers, in many different spellings, such as Rhine, Rein, Rain, Ragn, Ren, Reno and Rin.

Almost all headwaters of the Rhine are located in Switzerland. Only one of the shorter tributaries of the Hinterrhein, the Avers Rhine, has itself a tributary, the Reno di Lei, which is the outflow of Lago di Lei reservoir located in the Sondrio Province of Lombardy, Italy.

== Source of the Rhine according to maximum discharge ==
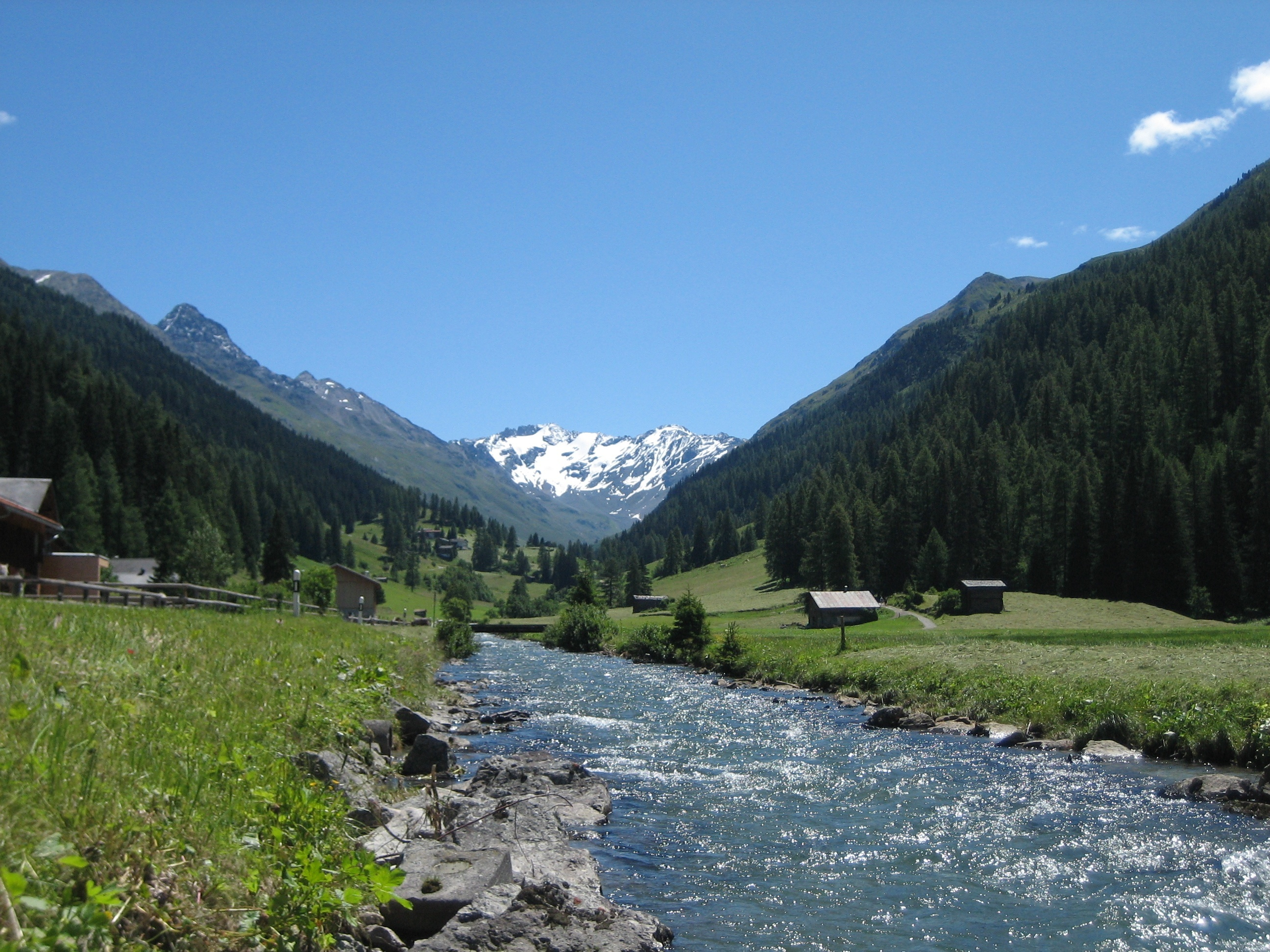
The Dischmabach in the Dischma valley (near Davos), the most distant source of the Hinterrhein river system and largest source of the Alpine Rhine

If one were to use largest discharge as one's criterion for deciding which flow should be called the Rhine, one need not look at eastern Switzerland at all, since the Aare (Aar) has a larger discharge than the High Rhine (Hochrhein) at their confluence near Koblenz, Aargau (557 m^{3}/s (19,700 cu ft/s) vs. 439 m^{3}/s (15,500 cu ft/s)); the Aare is, however, slightly shorter than the Rhine upstream of their confluence. For the following considerations, the Aare will be ignored.

The source of the main flow path can be obtained by following the river upstream and determining at each junction which of the two respective rivers the larger is. At the confluence of the Vorderrhein and Hinterrhein (forming the Rhine) at Reichenau, the average of the Vorderrhein is 53.8 m^{3}/s (1,900 cu ft/s) and the discharge of the Hinterrhein is somewhat larger at 59.6 m^{3}/s (2,100 cu ft/s). At the mouth of the Albula, in the natural state, the latter is larger than the Hinterrhein (29.1 m^{3}/s (1,030 cu ft/s) for the Albula compared with 27.3 m^{3}/s (960 cu ft/s) for the Hinterrhein). At the mouth of the Landwasser, the latter is significantly larger (9.45 m^{3}/s (334 cu ft/s) compared to 5.57 m^{3}/s (197 cu ft/s)). Among the headwaters of the Landwasser in the Davos area, the Dischmabach is slightly larger than the Flüelabach, even if considering the former small tributary flowing out of Lake Davos (Davosersee). This implies that the hydrological main branch starts at the top of the Dischma, far away from greater rivers bearing the name "Rhine".

The current values of the average discharge are rather different from the natural values, because many hydropower plants draw water from outside their natural catchment and this water bypasses some gauging stations. Water is retrieved from southern parts of the Vorderrhein watershed and released into the Hinterrhein, or taken from the Hinterrhein and released into the Albula, or taken from the Landwasser and Albula and released into the lower Hinterrhein (e.g. Albula-Landwasser Hydropower). In the upper Landwasser Valley, water is retrieved from the Flüelabach and Davosersee and released in a neighbouring valley near Aeua in the Klosters area.

== Source of the Rhine by length ==
Near the "source of the Rhine" at Lake Toma, there is a well-known sign with the erroneous information, "1320 km to the mouth"; it is only about 1,230 km (760 mi). The number of 1,320 km (820 mi) is widespread. It is unclear whether it refers to the river length as measured from Lake Toma. It may be the result of transposing digits.

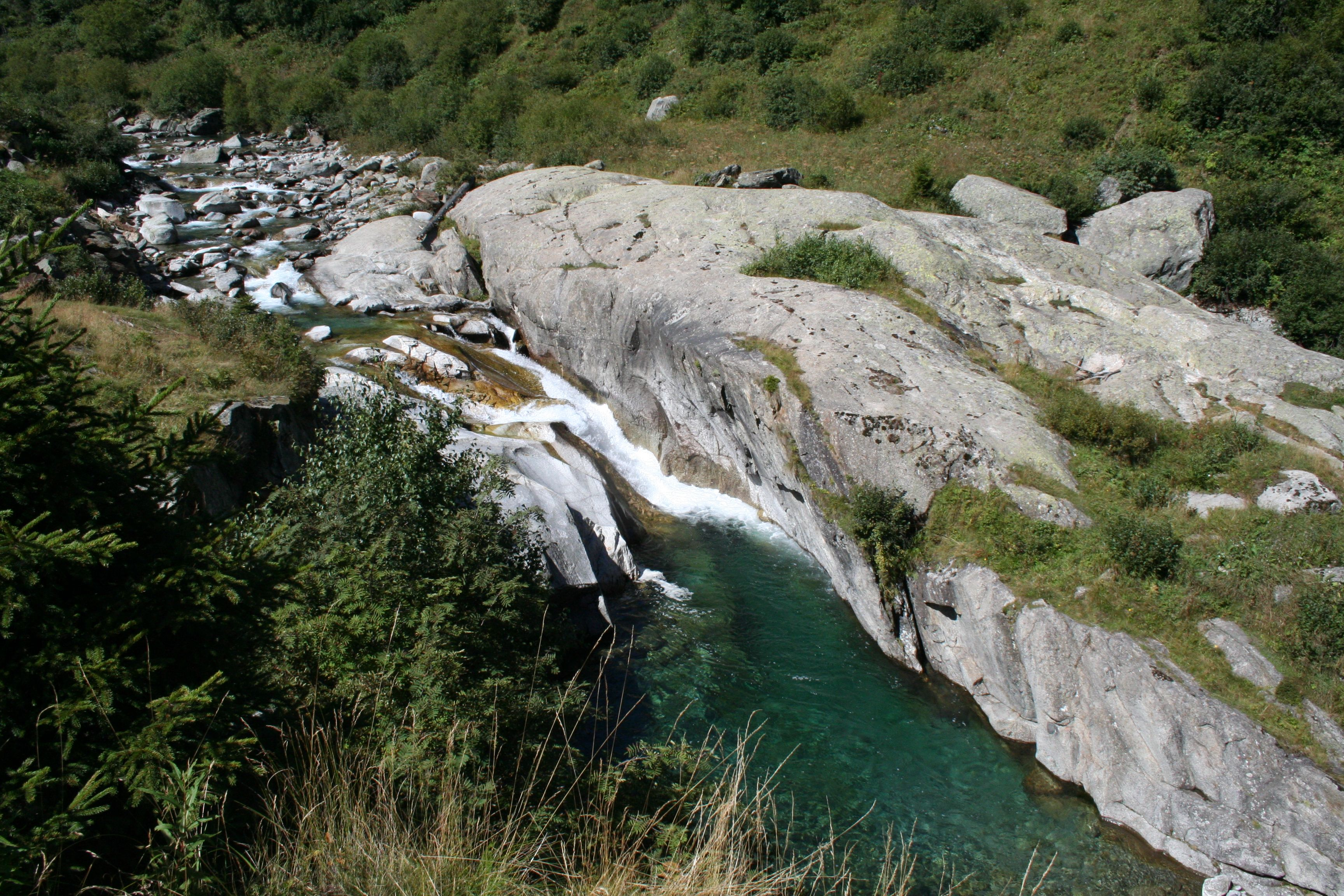
The Rein da Medel (at Pardé), the most distant source of both the Vorderrhein river system and the Rhine system as a whole

The flow path from the source in Lake Toma through Rein da Tuma measures about 71 km (44 mi) to the confluence of the Vorderrhein and Hinterrhein. From there it is more about 1,160 km (720 mi) downriver to the North Sea. There are, however, some longer flow paths in the Vorderrhein area. Measuring the longest path from the source to the confluence at Reichenau:

- About 76 km (47 mi): Rein da Medel (the central part is also known as Froda; the headwaters in the canton of Ticino are known as Reno di Medel)
- About 75 km (47 mi): Rein da Maighels (a tributary of the Rein da Curnera)
- About 74 km (46 mi): Rein da Curnera
- About 71 km (44 mi): Rein da Tuma (counting Lake Toma and the longest stream into the lake)
- About 71 km (44 mi): Rein da Nalps
- About 70 km (43 mi): two unnamed streams descending from the Puozas and Milez areas close to the Oberalp Pass
- About 70 km (43 mi): the Aua da Val, descending from the valley Val, which disappears under a moraine at an altitude of 2,367 m (7,766 ft) and reappears on a ledge some distance lower
- About 69.5 km (43.2 mi): Aua da Urlaun, a tributary of the Rein da Tuma

The flow paths in the Hinterrhein tend to be slightly shorter:

- About 72 km (45 mi): Dischmabach
- About 70 km (43 mi): Flüelabach
- About 64 km (40 mi): Hinterrhein
- About 64 km (40 mi): Totalpbach (a former headwater of the Landwasser; now flows into Lake Davos and from there the water is artificially piped to Klosters)
- About 63 km (39 mi): Gelgia
- About 61 km (38 mi): Madrischer Rhein
- About 56 km (35 mi): The Ava da Ravais, headwater of the Albula flows east from Bergün
- About 53 km (33 mi): a headwater of the Albula descending from the Crap Alv Laiets near the Albula Pass

The longest headwater of both the Vorderrhein and the Rhine as a whole, therefore, is the Reno di Medel, rising about 7.5 km (4.7 mi) south of Lake Toma. Its spring and upper reaches are located west of the Lukmanier Pass in the municipality of Quinto in the canton of Ticino.

== Size of the catchment areas ==
The catchment area of the Vorderrhein covers about 1,512 km^{2} (584 sq mi); the basin of the Hinterrhein (including the Albula and Landwasser), is slightly larger at 1,693 km^{2} (654 sq mi). The percentage of precipitation flowing down the river is fairly similar in the valleys of the headwaters of the Rhine, so the size of the catchment area tends to be proportional to the average discharge, and therefore this criterion does not need to be considered separately.

== Summary ==
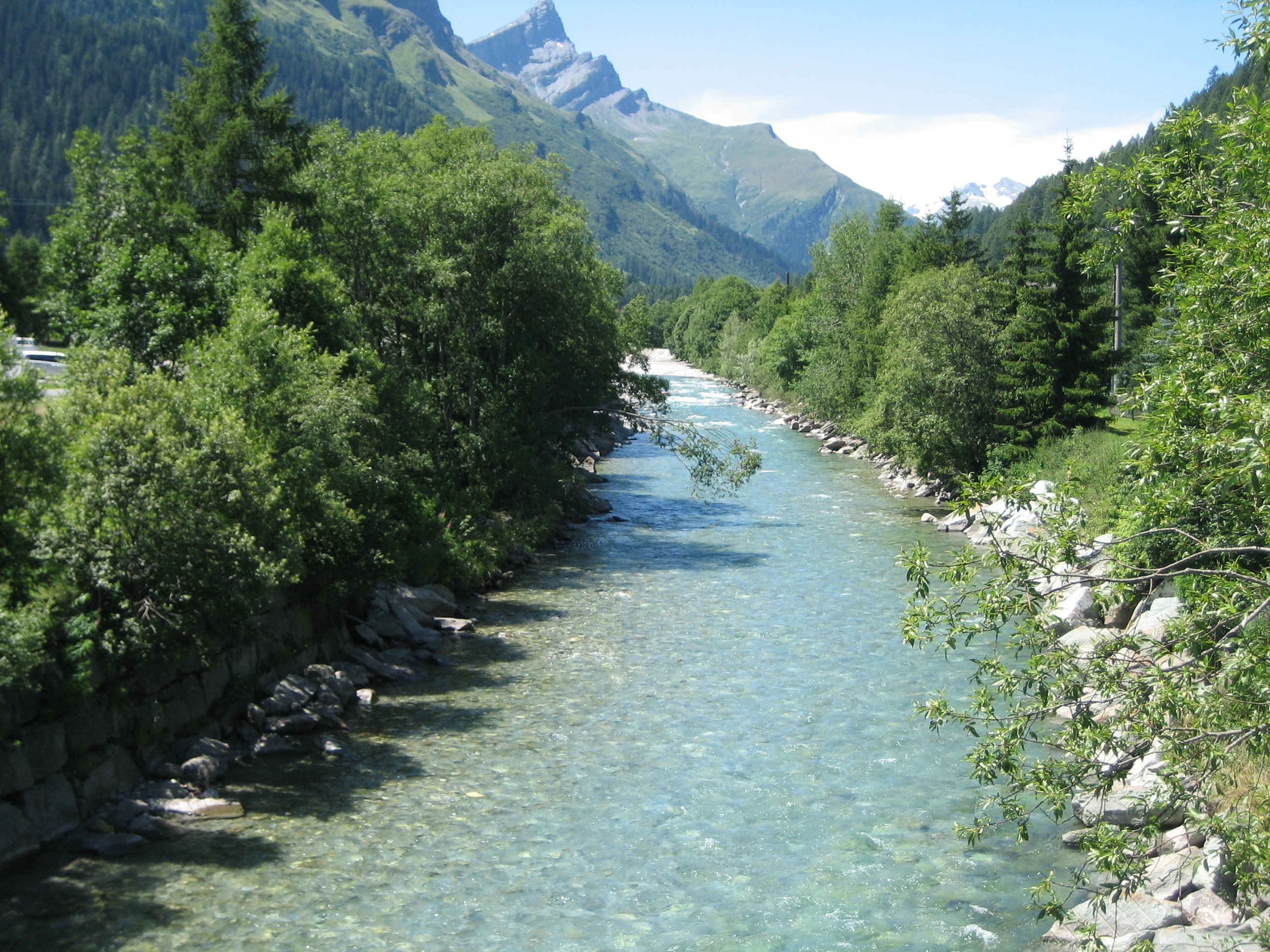
The Hinterrhein near Splügen

No clear hierarchy can be established among the headwaters of the Rhine. The two main systems, the Vorderrhein (Anterior Rhine) in the west and the Hinterrhein (Posterior Rhine) in the south and east, differ only slightly in length, discharge and size of their catchment areas.

The longest paths begin in the upper Surselva (valley of the Rein Anteriur) and the upper Landwasser Valley, respectively the most western and the most eastern parts of the headwaters area. The longest headwater of the Vorderrhein (and therefore the Rhine) is the Reno di Medel, which rises in Ticino.

The source of the hydrological main path would be found in the east, in the Dischma valley of the Dischmabach, although in terms of discharge only, the Aare (Aar) would be the main river upstream of its confluence with the Rhine, and its source, the Aare Glaciers, would be the source of the river called the 'Rhine' further downstream.

== See also ==
- List of rivers of Switzerland
- Hydrology of Switzerland
