= Dischmabach =

River in Switzerland

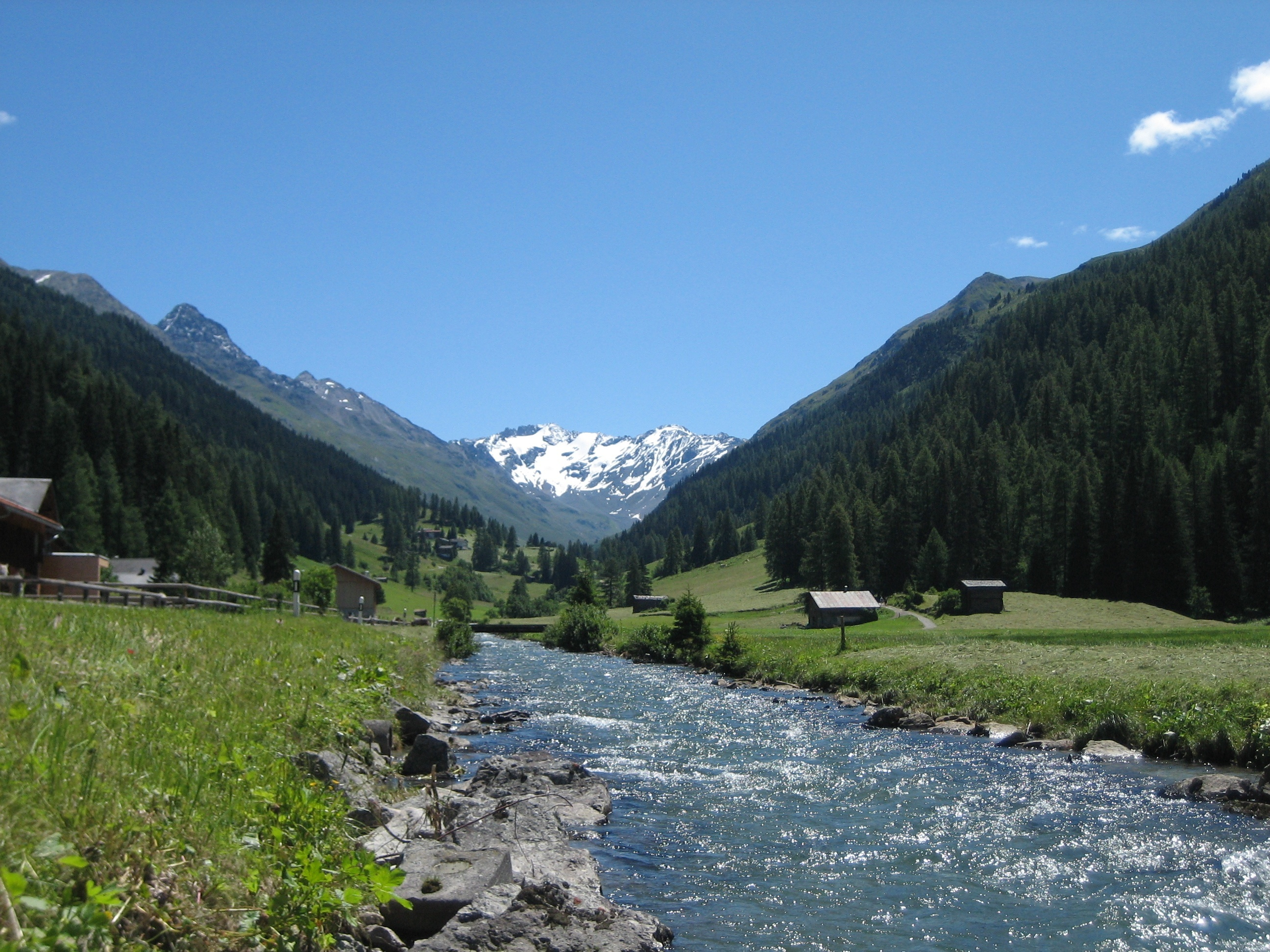
- Dischmabach in the Dischma valley

Location
- Country: Switzerland
- Location: Graubünden

Physical characteristics
- Source
  - location: Two headwaters come together in Dürrboden
  - elevation: 2,700 m (8,900 ft)
- Mouth
  - location: Confluence with the Landwasser
  - coordinates: 46°48′5″N 9°50′16″E
  - elevation: 1,550 m (5,090 ft)
- Length: 15 km (9.3 mi)

Basin features
- Progression: Landwasser→ Albula→ Hinterrhein→ Rhine→ North Sea

The Dischmabach is a river of approximately 15 km long in the river system of Albula. It drains the Dischma valley, its catchment area lies mainly in the area of the Swiss municipality of Davos.

The source Dischmabach has two equal headwaters. The one on the National Map of Switzerland is a creek without a registered name and has its headwaters in the area of the Scaletta Pass (46°41′37″N 9°55′35″E). The other headwater is called Furggabach and has its headwaters on Fuorcla Grialetsch at 46°43′4″N 9°57′3″E. The confluence of the two headwaters is at Dürrboden. Then the Dischmabach flows in a northwesterly direction through the elongated and gently sloping Dischma valley and flows into the Landwasser between Davos Dorf and Davos Platz.

Within the Posterior Rhine system, the sources of Dischmabach are about 72 km from the confluence of the Anterior and Posterior Rhine. Only the headwaters Rein da Medel, Rein da Maighels and Rein da Curnera in the Vorderrhein system are further away from this confluence (about 74–76 km). Thus the Dischmabach is, in terms of length, one of the most important headwaters of the Rhine (see also sources of the Rhine).

== See also ==
- List of rivers of Switzerland
