= Rein da Tuma =

River in Switzerland

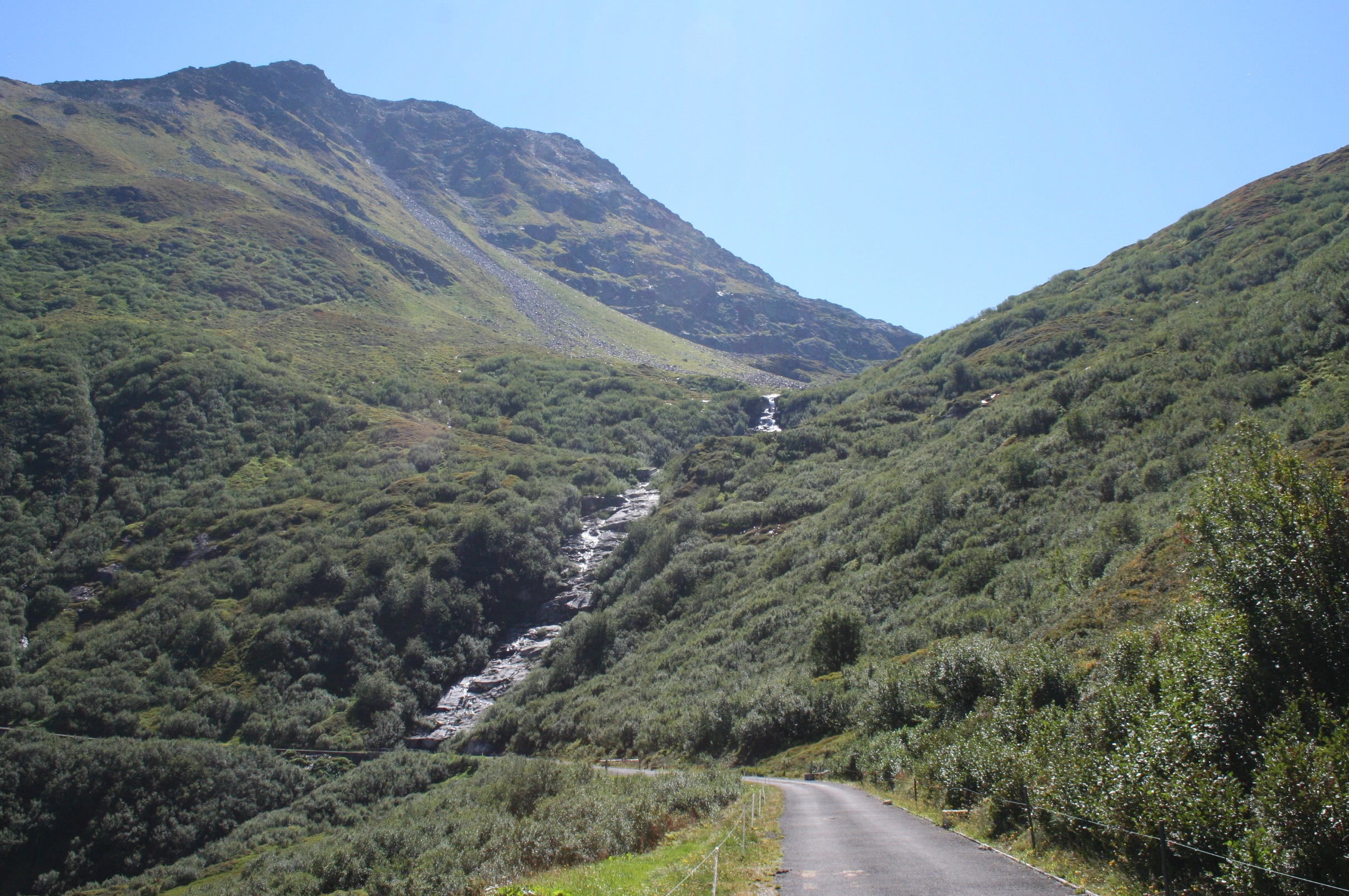
- Rein da Tuma

Location
- Country: Switzerland
- Canton: Canton of Graubünden

Physical characteristics
- Source
  - location: East of the Rossbodenstock
  - coordinates: 46°38′12″N 8°39′37″E

Basin features
- Progression: Vorderrhein→ Rhine→ North Sea

The Rein da Tuma is a river in Switzerland, in the Canton of Graubünden. It rises east of the Rossbodenstock with two or three mountain streams, that flow across the Tuma Alp into the Lake Toma (German: Tomasee, Romansh: Lai da Tuma). Before reaching the lake, it flows through a plain and forms small meanders. The Rein da Tuma flows out of Lake Toma on the north east and flows as Anterior Rhine past the village of Tschamut in the municipality of Tujetsch.

== See also ==
- Sources of the Rhine
- List of rivers of Switzerland
