= Lake Davos =

- Davosersee (German)
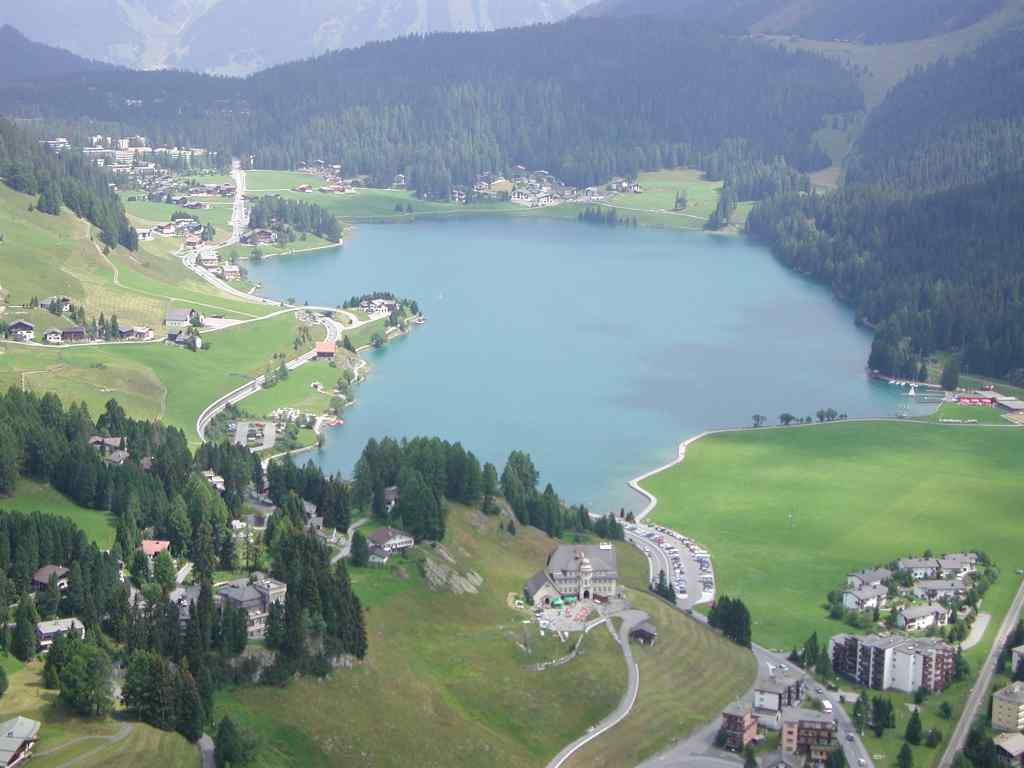

- Location within Canton of Graubünden Location within Switzerland Location within Alps
- Interactive map of Lake Davos
- Location: Davos, canton of the Grisons
- Coordinates: 46°49′11″N 9°51′15″E
- Type: natural lake
- Primary inflows: Flüelabach, Totalpbach
- Primary outflows: Landquart (river)
- Basin countries: Switzerland
- Max. length: 1.5 km (0.93 mi)
- Max. width: 0.5 km (0.31 mi)
- Surface area: 0.59 km^{2} (0.23 sq mi)
- Max. depth: 54 m (177 ft)
- Surface elevation: 1,560 m (5,120 ft)
- Frozen: Winter season
- Settlements: Davos Dorf

Lake Davos (German: Davosersee) is a small natural lake at Davos, Switzerland. Its surface area is 0.59 km² and the maximum depth is 54 m. Fed by sources of the Rhine, Flüelabach and Totalpbach, among other mountain creeks, the lake is used as a hydropower reservoir; its water no longer flows to the river Landwasser but is channeled into the river Landquart at Klosters.

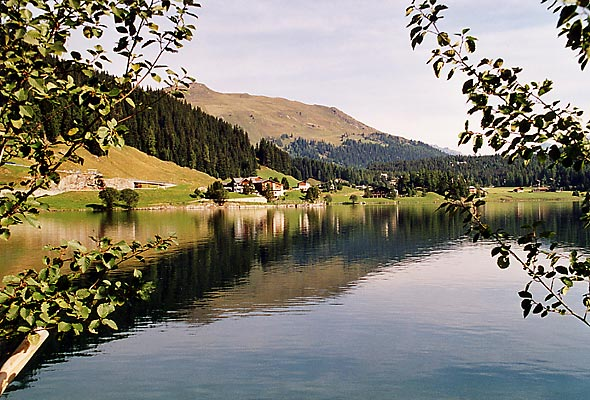

== See also ==
- List of lakes of Switzerland
- List of mountain lakes of Switzerland
