= Lai da Palpuogna =

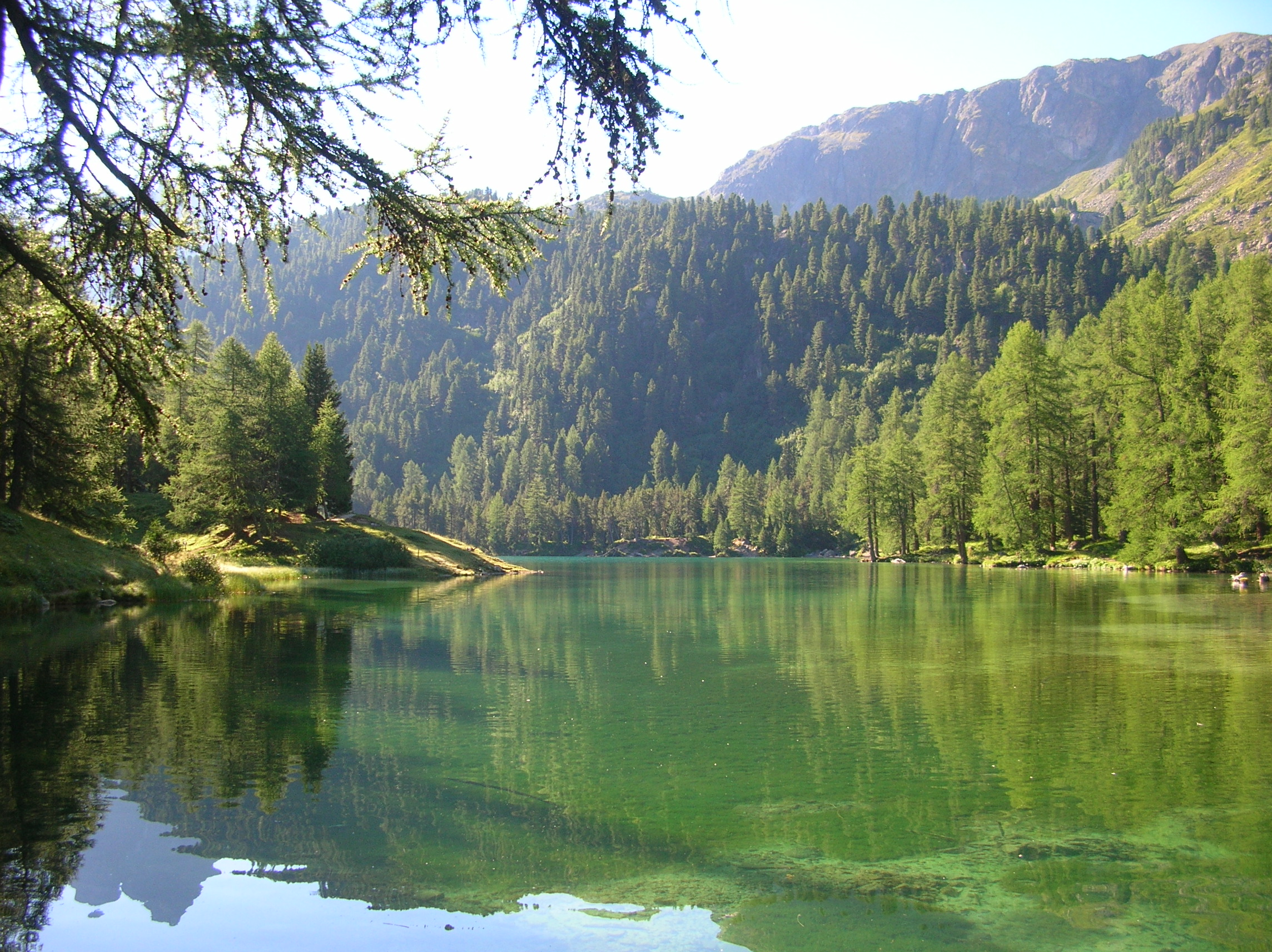

- Location within Canton of Graubünden Location within Switzerland Location within Italy Location within Alps
- Interactive map of Lai da Palpuogna
- Location: Bergün, Grisons
- Coordinates: 46°34′51″N 9°47′07″E
- Type: natural lake
- Primary inflows: Albula
- Primary outflows: Albula
- Basin countries: Switzerland
- Max. length: 500 m (1,600 ft)
- Max. width: 100 m (330 ft)
- Max. depth: 25 m (82 ft)
- Surface elevation: 1,918 m (6,293 ft)

Lai da Palpuogna (Romansh; German: Palpuognasee) is a mountain lake at Albula Pass in the municipality of Bergün, in the Grisons, Switzerland. Surrounded by pine forests and majestic peaks, the lake offers a serene setting that captivates visitors throughout the year. The crystal-clear waters reflect the sky and mountains, creating a picturesque scene that's perfect for photography. In a 2007 television program of the Swiss channel SF 1, the lake was voted the most beautiful place in Switzerland. Many tourists and locals visit this natural wonder to hike, picnic, and immerse themselves in its tranquil beauty.

To protect the ecology and biodiversity of the lake, the municipality of Bergün has prohibited the use of the lake for swimming in order to avoid contamination with sunscreen and other products used by visitors.

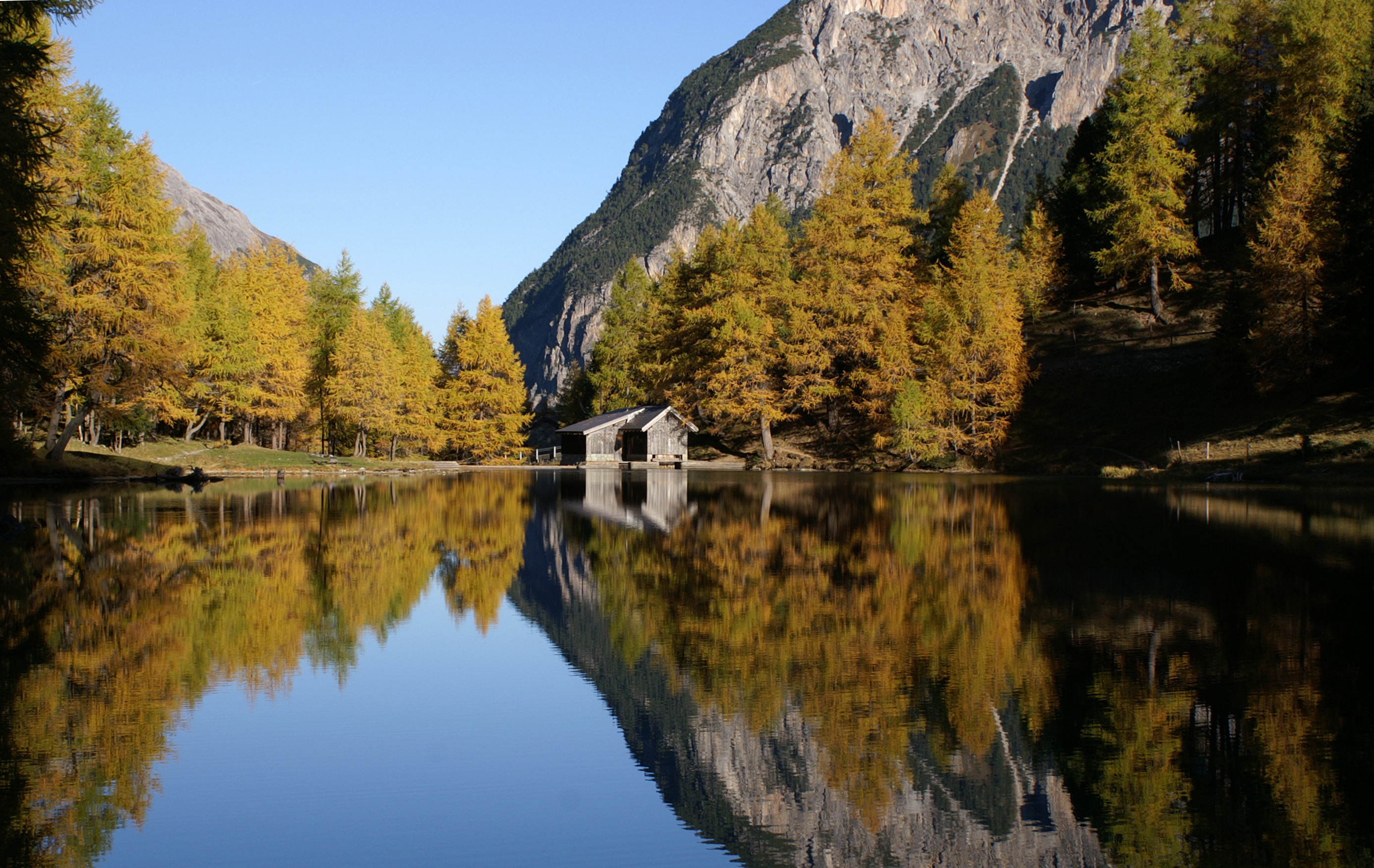

== See also ==
- List of mountain lakes of Switzerland
