= Rossbodenstock =

Mountain in Switzerland

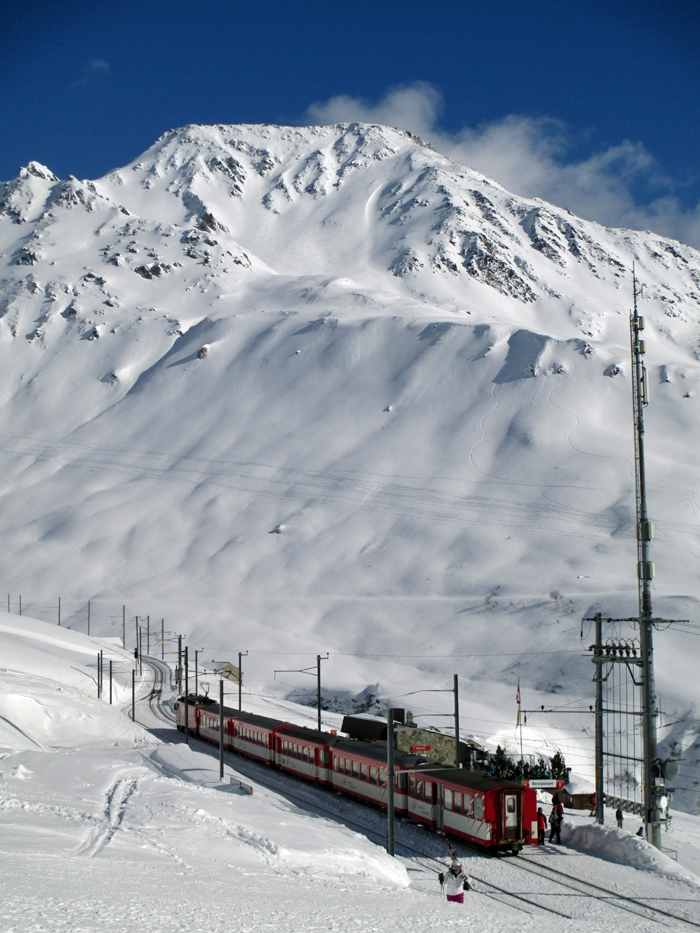

Highest point
- Elevation: 2,836 m (9,304 ft)
- Coordinates: 46°38′6.8″N 8°39′3.4″E

Naming
- English translation: Horse Ground Stem
- Language of name: German

Geography
- Location within Switzerland
- Location: Uri / Graubünden
- Country: Switzerland
- Parent range: Saint-Gotthard Massif, Lepontine Alps
- Topo map: Swiss Federal Office of Topography swisstopo

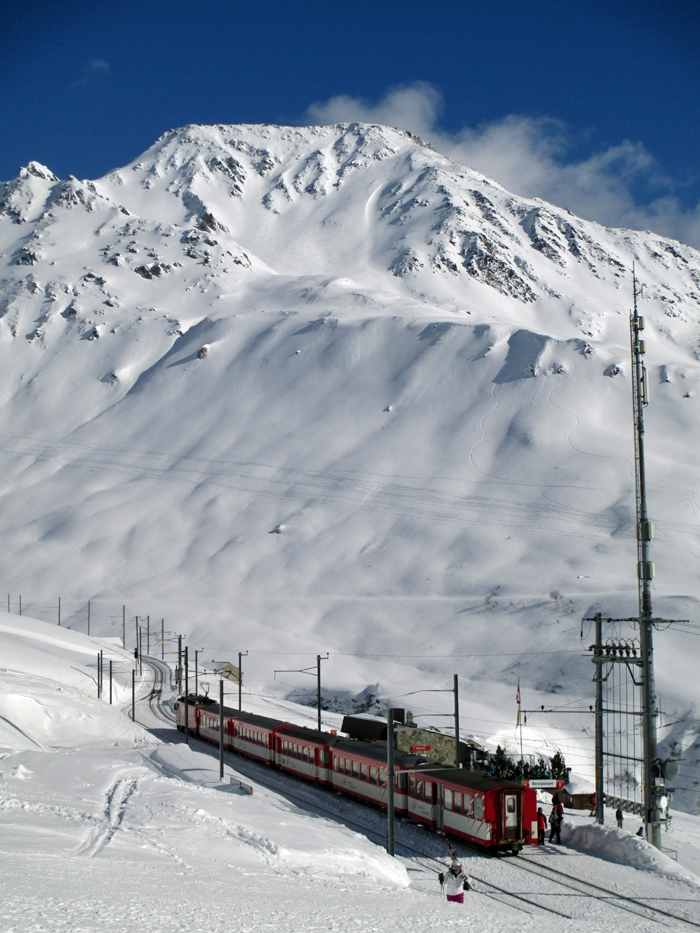

Rossbodenstock is a mountain peak of the Saint-Gotthard Massif and part of the Lepontine Alps south of the Oberalp Pass. It is 2,836 metres (9,304 ft) high; its peak is located on the border between the cantons of Uri and Graubünden, which follows the ridge from north to south.

The source of the Rein da Tuma, the source of the Rhine is on the eastern flank of the mountain.
