= Rabiusa =

River in Switzerland

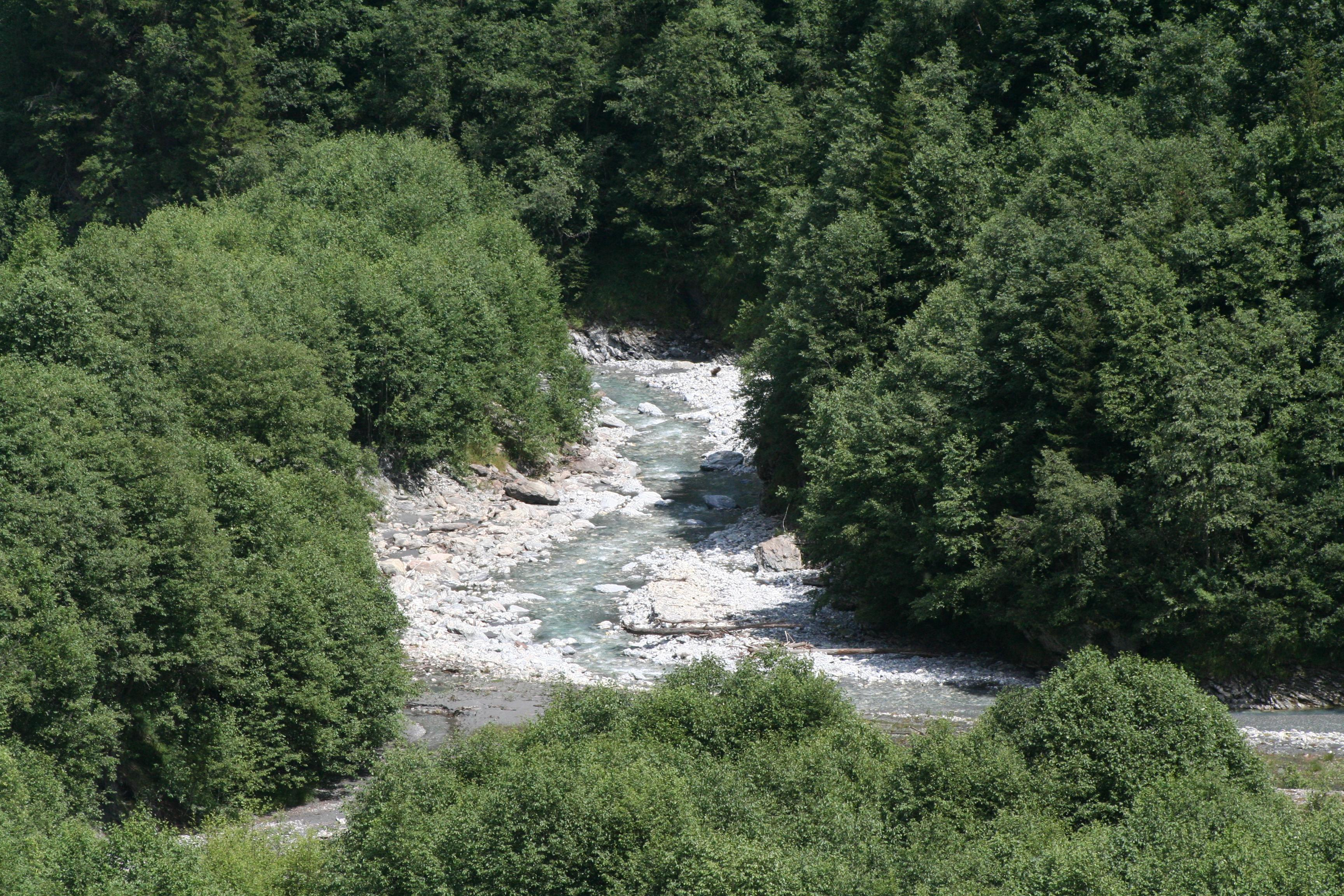
- The Rabiusa

Location
- Country: Switzerland
- Region: Safien

Physical characteristics
- Source
  - location: Bärenhorn Mountains in Hinterrhein,
  - coordinates: 46°35′3″N 9°14′44″E
- Mouth
  - location: Confluence with Anterior Rhine in the Versam Gorge,
  - coordinates: 46°48′16″N 9°19′49″E
- Length: 32.5 km (20.2 mi)

Basin features
- Progression: Vorderrhein→ Rhine→ North Sea
- Tributaries
  - right: Carnusbach

The Rabiusa (Romansh: Rabiosa, i.e. "Raging", in the local German dialect Rii, i.e. "Rhine") is a 32 km long tributary of the Rhine. The river originates in the district Hinterrhein in the canton of Graubünden, in the mountains surrounding the Bärenhorn (2929 m), where the old bridle path from Safien to Splügen crosses the Safierberg Pass (2486 m). It then flows through the wooded Safien valley and into the rough Versam Gorge, where it is spanned by the Versam Gorge Bridge. The confluence with the Anterior Rhine is located in the equally deep Ruinaulta.

The Carnusbach flows into the Rabiusa in a hamlet above the village of Safien-Platz.

The Walser village of Safien is the only municipality on the river.
