= Vorderrhein =

River in Grisons, Switzerland

Vorderrhein Anterior Rhine
- The Vorderrhein in the Ruinaulta gorge

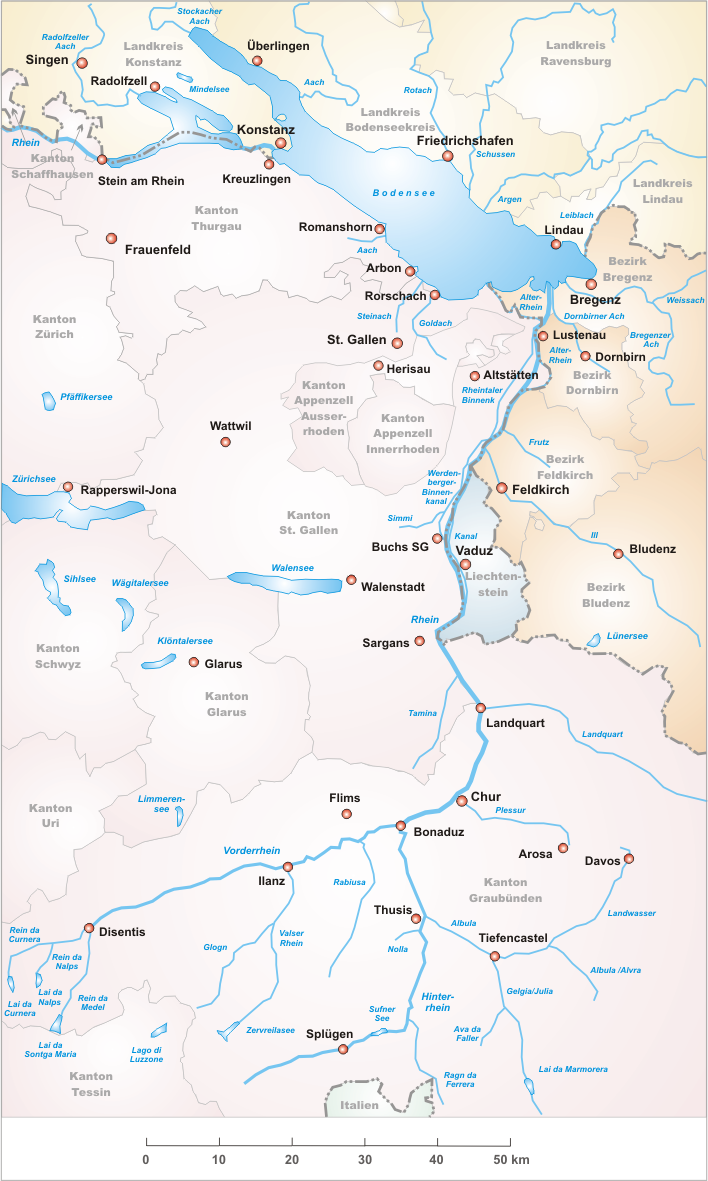
- Area of the Alpine Rhine with its headwaters
- Native name: Rein Anteriur (Sursilvan); Ragn Anteriur (Sutsilvan); Rain Anteriur (Rumantsch Grischun); Vorderrhein (German)

Location
- Country: Switzerland
- Canton: Grisons

Physical characteristics
- Source
  - location: Lai Urlaun
  - coordinates: 46°37′34″N 8°41′04″E
- Mouth
  - location: Reichenau
  - coordinates: 46°49′24″N 9°24′28″E
  - elevation: 585 m (1,919 ft)
- Length: 76 km (47 mi)
- Basin size: 1,512 km^{2} (584 sq mi)
- Discharge
  - average: 53.8 m^{3}/s (1,900 cu ft/s)

Basin features
- Progression: Rhine→ North Sea
- Tributaries
  - left: Aua da Russein, Flem, Schmuèr, Ual da Mulin
  - right: Glenner, Rabiusa, Rein da Curnera, Rein da Medel, Rein da Nalps, Rein da Sumvitg

The Vorderrhein (German: [ˈfɔʁdɐˌʁaɪn]; Sursilvan: Rein Anteriur; Sutsilvan: Ragn Anteriur; Rumantsch Grischun, Vallader, and Puter: Rain Anteriur; Surmiran: Ragn anteriour), or Anterior Rhine, is the left of the two initial tributaries of the Rhine (the other being the Hinterrhein). It is longer than the Hinterrhein, but has a lower discharge than the latter at their confluence, which marks the beginning of the Alpine Rhine section.

The Vorderrhein and nearly all of its tributaries are located in the Swiss canton of Grisons (Graubünden), with the largest communities along the river being Disentis and Ilanz. One of its upper tributaries, the Rein da Medel, rises in the canton of Ticino.

Vorderrhein was also the name of a judicial district that was created in 1851 with the reorganization of the judiciary of Graubünden. In 2001, it was annexed by the District Surselva.

== Geography ==
=== Course ===
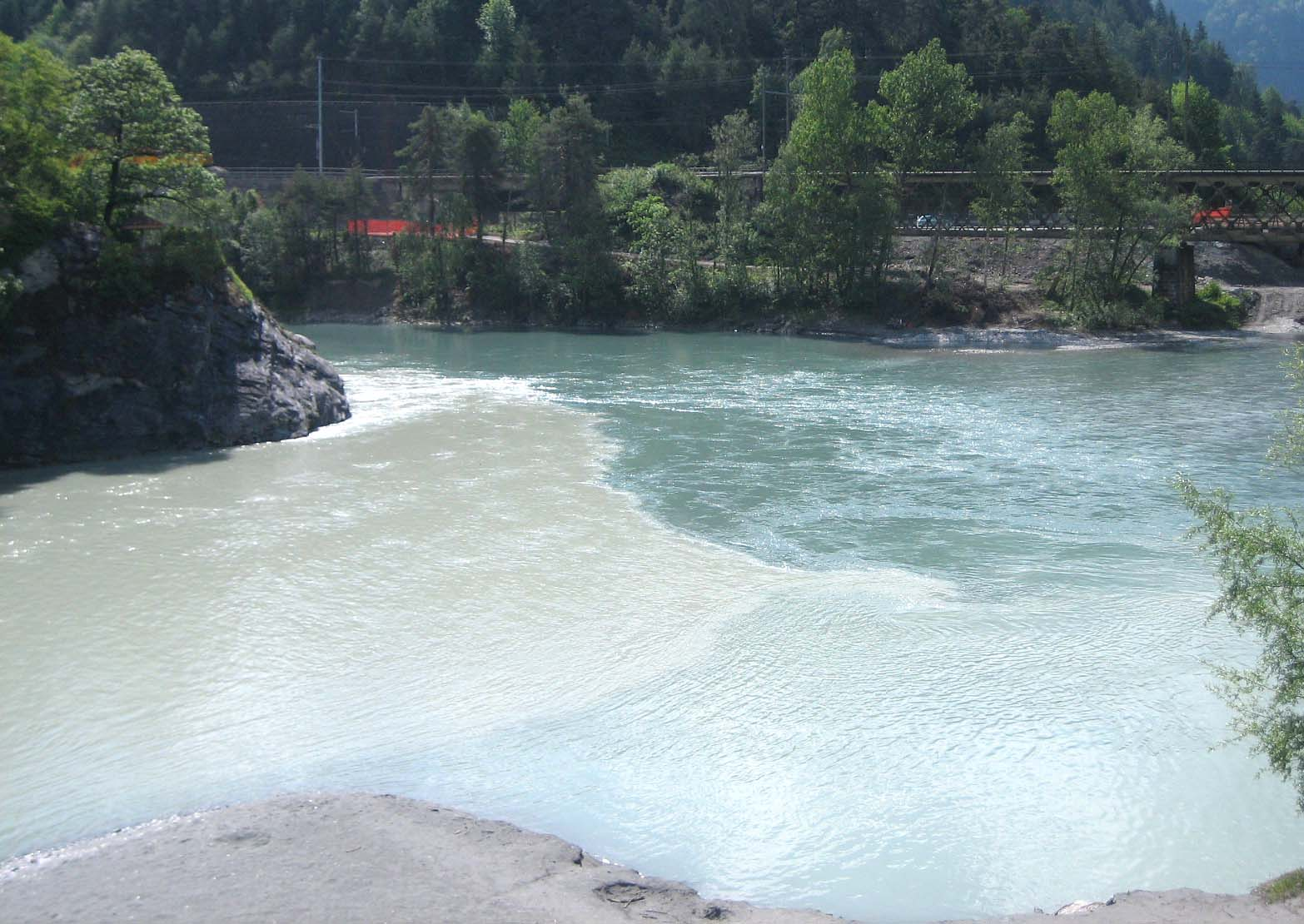
Confluence of the Hinterrhein (right) and the Vorderrhein (left) at Reichenau

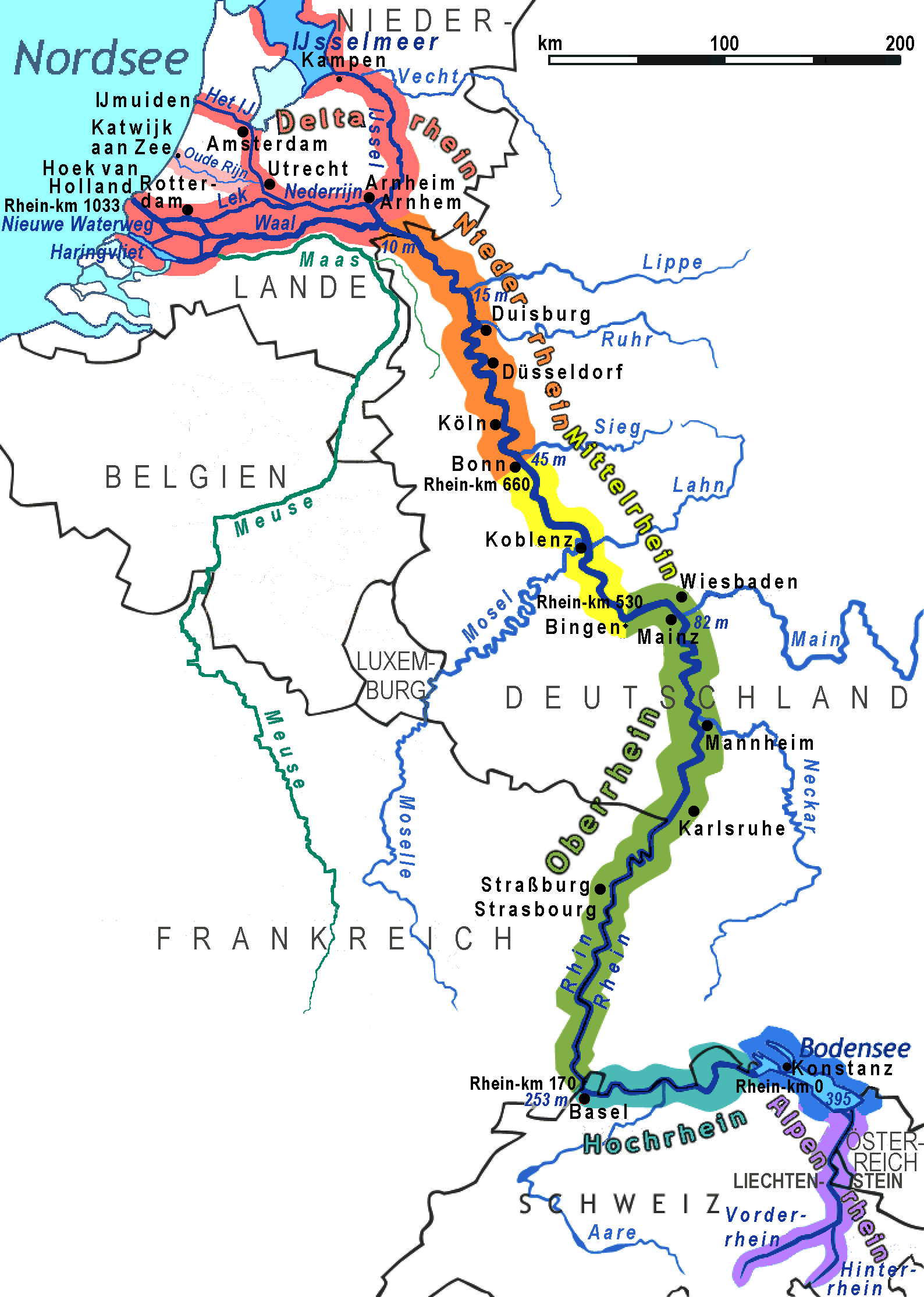
Sections of the Rhine: Rhine–Meuse–Scheldt delta Lower Rhine Middle Rhine Upper Rhine High Rhine Lake Constance (Untersee, Seerhein, Obersee) Alpine Rhine, Vorderrhein, Hinterrhein Rhine sources

The Vorderrhein flows mostly in an east-northeast direction, through the Surselva, a large longitudinal valley. Its north side is steep, with short valleys. The southern side, however, is divided by some long valleys (similarly to the situation in the canton of Valais further west). Consequently, its main tributaries, the Rein da Sumvitg, the Glenner and the Rabiusa, all come from the south, or right side of the Vorderrhein. In its lower course, the Vorderrhein flows through the Flims Rockslide, giving rise to the canyon country of the Ruinaulta. Near Reichenau, it joins the Hinterrhein to form the Alpine Rhine, which continues to Lake Constance (Bodensee).

The catchment area of the Vorderrhein, measuring 1,512 square kilometres (584 square miles), is located mainly in the canton of Grisons (Graubünden), Switzerland. The Vorderrhein is about 76 kilometres (47 mi) long, thus more than 5% longer than the Hinterrhein (each measured to the furthest source). The Vorderrhein, however, has an average water flow of 53.8 m^{3}/s (1,900 cu ft/s), which is less than the flow of the Hinterrhein (59.6 m^{3}/s (2,100 cu ft/s)).

According to the Atlas of Switzerland of the Swiss Federal Office of Topography, the source of the Vorderrhein—and thus of the Rhine—is located north of the Rein da Tuma and Lake Toma.

=== Headwaters ===
Some of the tributaries of the Vorderrhein are almost as long as the main branch. In downstream order, they are (measuring their length from their respective sources to the confluence with the Hinterrhein at Reichenau, near Bonaduz):

- Two unnamed streams originating in the Puozas and Milez areas near the Oberalppass
- Rein da Tuma, including the Lai da Tuma and the main head of the lake, about 71 kilometres (44 mi)
- The Aua da Val from the Val valley (70 km (43 mi))
- Rein da Maighels (75 km) (tributary of Rein da Curnera)
- Rein da Curnera (about 74 km (46 mi))
- Rein da Nalps (about 71 km (44 mi))
- Rein da Medel; the upper reaches in the canton of Ticino are known as the Reno di Medel, and also as the Froda (about 76 km (47 mi))

Thus, the longer arms are not the source at Oberalppass, but further southeast. The longest headwater of the Vorderrhein (and thus the Rhine as a whole; see sources of the Rhine), is the Reno di Medel, which rises on the border of the municipality Quinto in Ticino. In the uppermost part of its course, it runs in the Val Cadlimo, south of the geomorphological main Alpine ridge, west of the Lukmanier Pass.

The high point of the Vorderrhein's drainage basin is the Piz Russein of the Tödi massif of the Glarus Alps at 3,613 metres (11,854 ft) above sea level. It starts with the creek Aua da Russein (lit. 'Waters of the Russein').

Witenwasserenstock mountain is the triple divide of the drainage basins between the rivers Rhine, Rhône and Po.

== Tourism ==
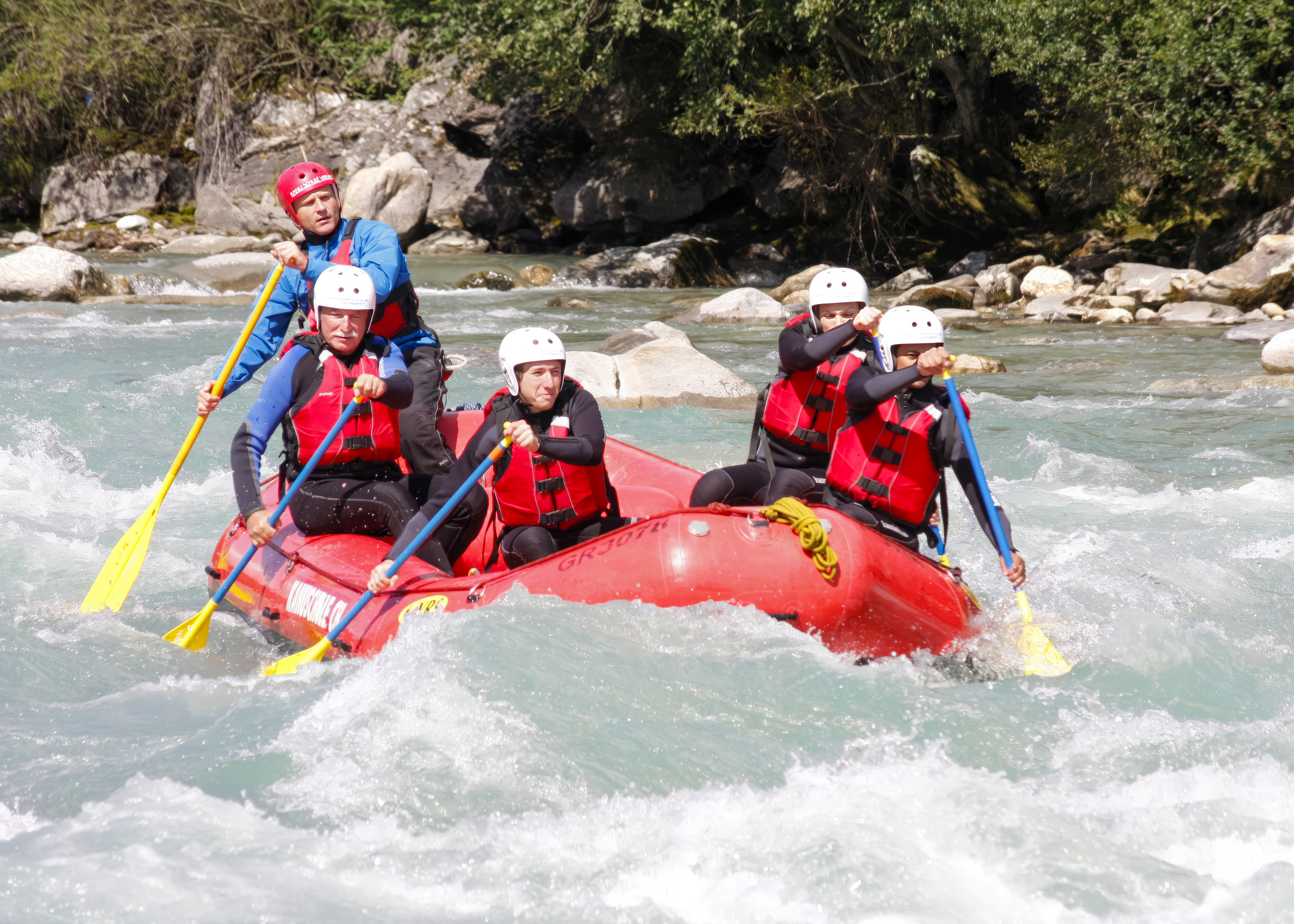
Rafting from Ilanz to Versam

Due to its attractive scenery and some interesting passages, the Vorderrhein is a popular river for paddling and rafting, especially the section between Ilanz and Versam.

Along entire length of the Vorderrhein, there are two narrow-gauge railway lines. The Reichenau-Tamins–Disentis/Mustér railway is served by the Rhätische Bahn between Chur and Disentis/Mustér. From Disentis, the Furka-Oberalp line, served by the Matterhorn Gotthard Bahn, runs over the Oberalp Pass to Andermatt (canton of Uri) and onwards to Brig (canton of Valais).

In the Ruinaulta area, the main road runs to the north of the river, and at its highest point, at Flims, it is about 480 metres (1,575 ft) above the Rhine.

The Senda Sursilvana, a hiking trail, leads from the Oberalp Pass along the Vorderrhein in the direction of Chur.

== Gallery ==
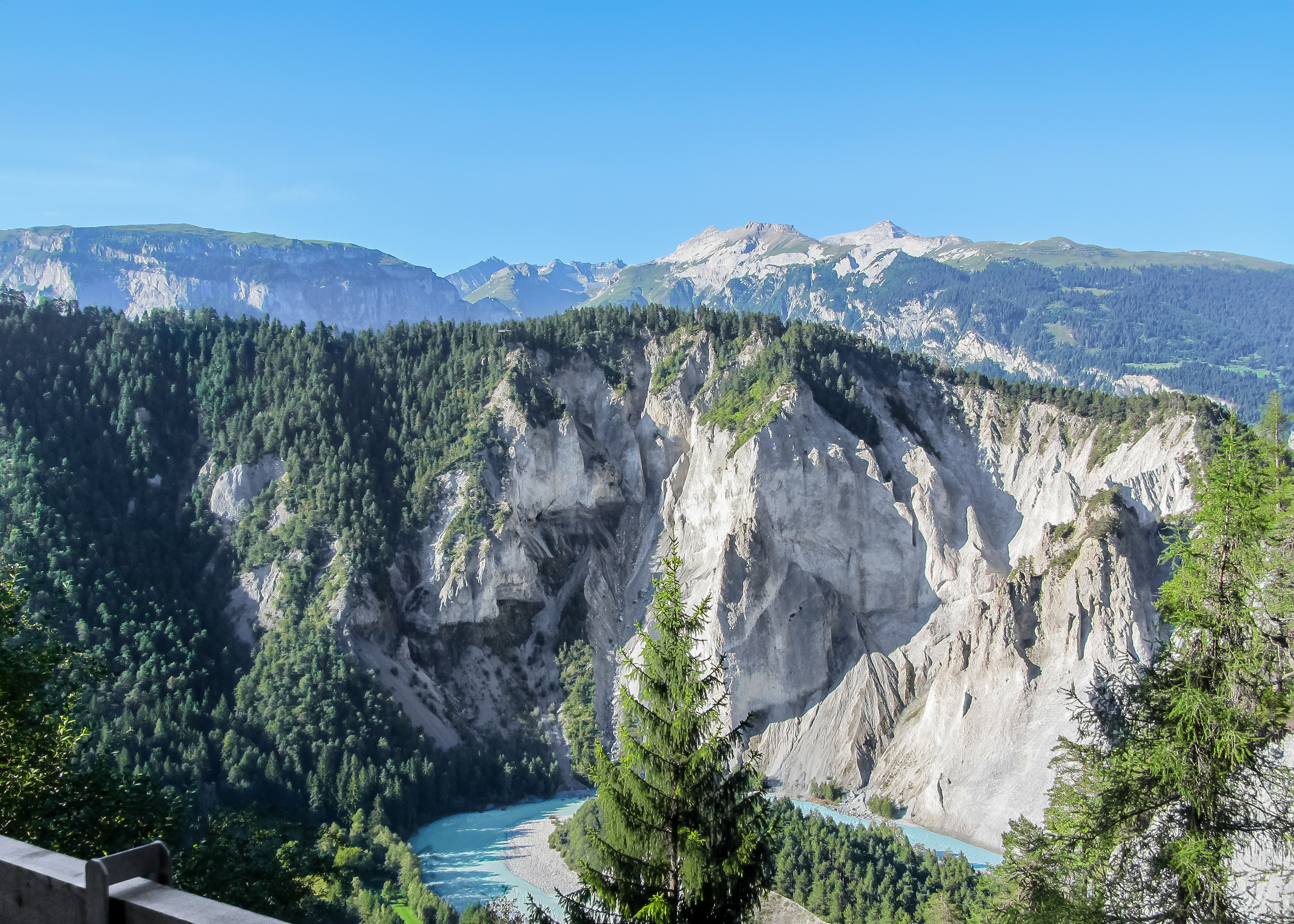
Vorderrhein and Ruinaulta as seen from Islabord PostAuto stop in Versam

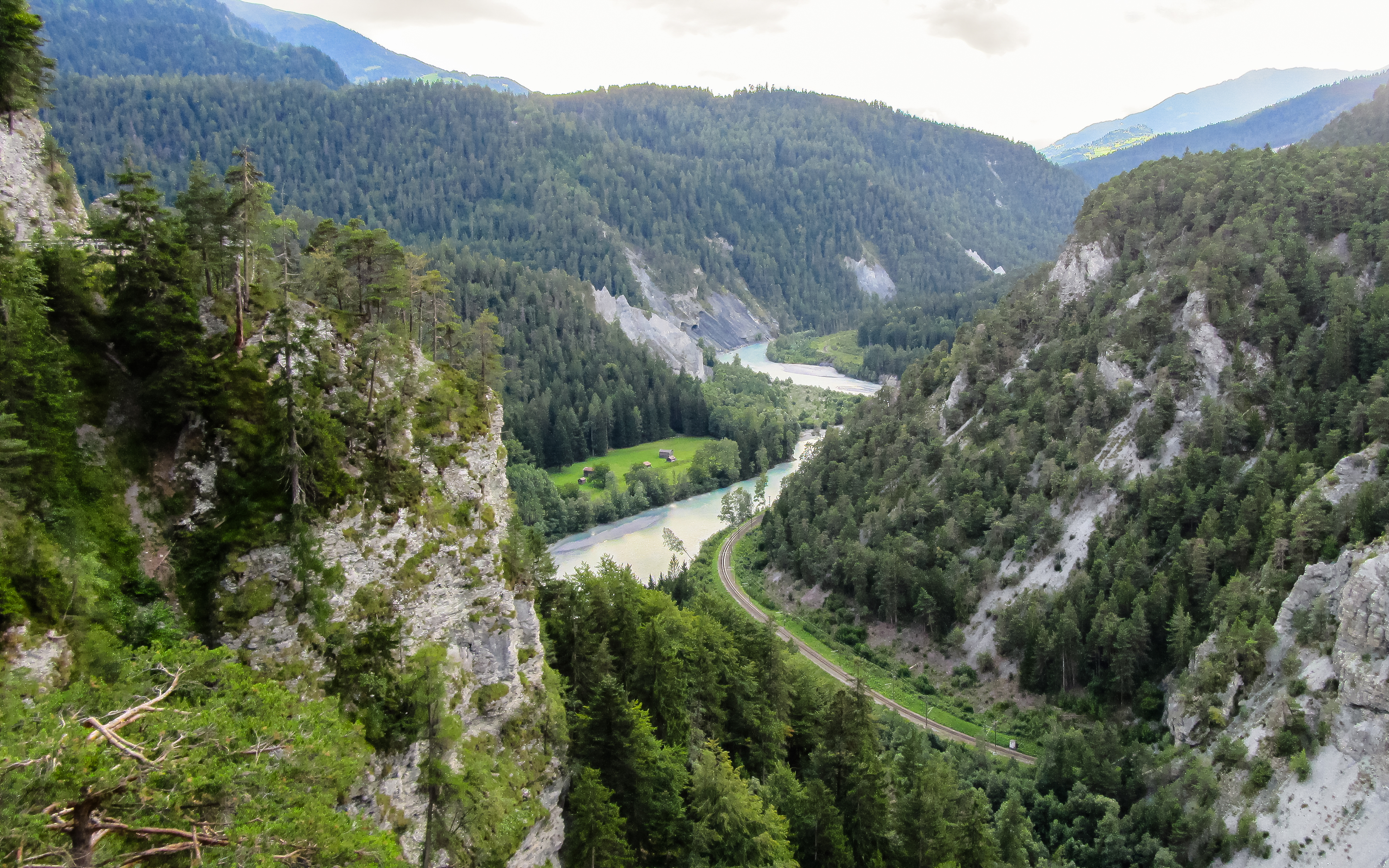
Vorderrhein and Ruinaulta as seen from Zault Observation Deck in Bonaduz

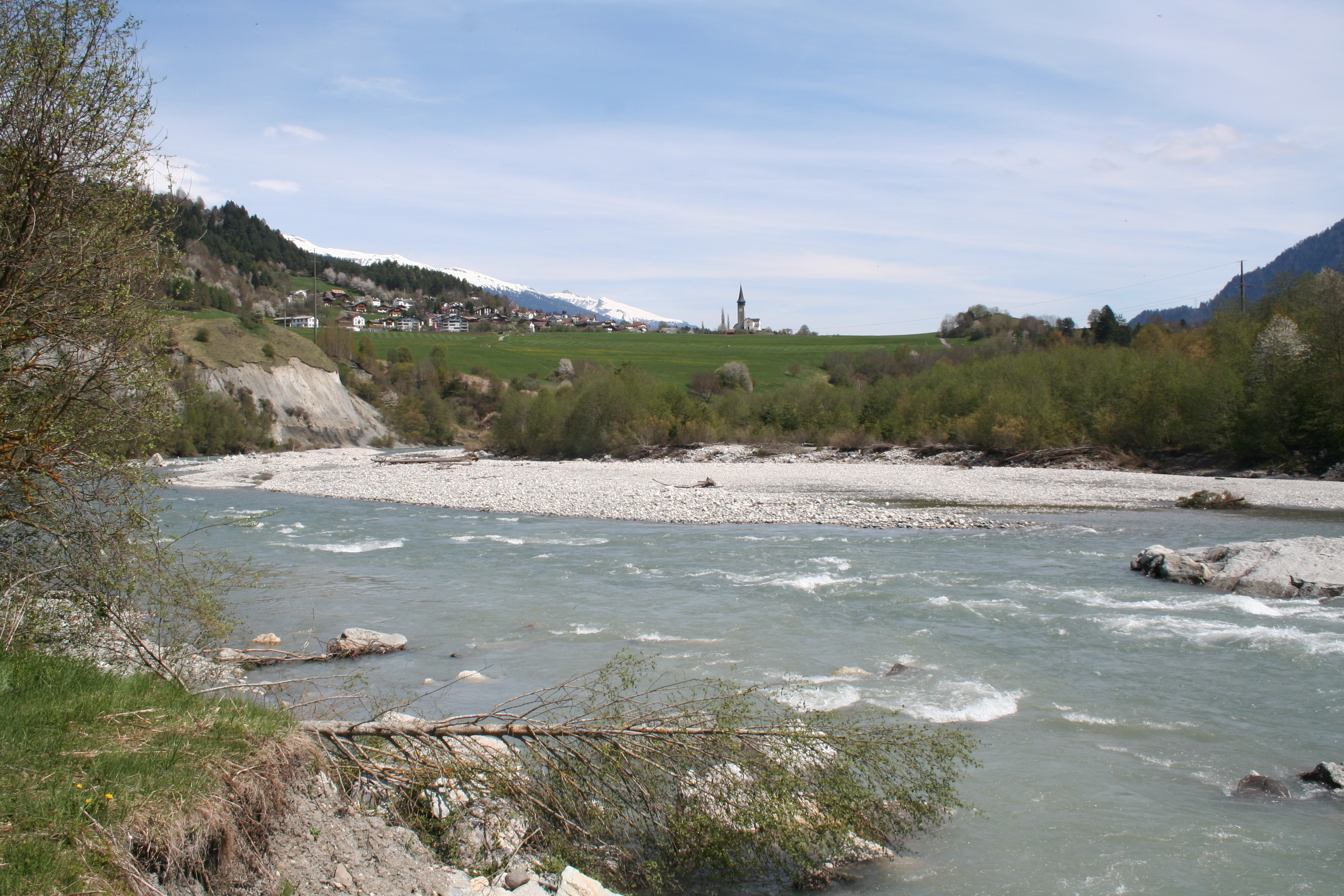
The Vorderrhein at Schluein

== See also ==
- List of rivers of Switzerland
