= Landwasser =

River in Switzerland

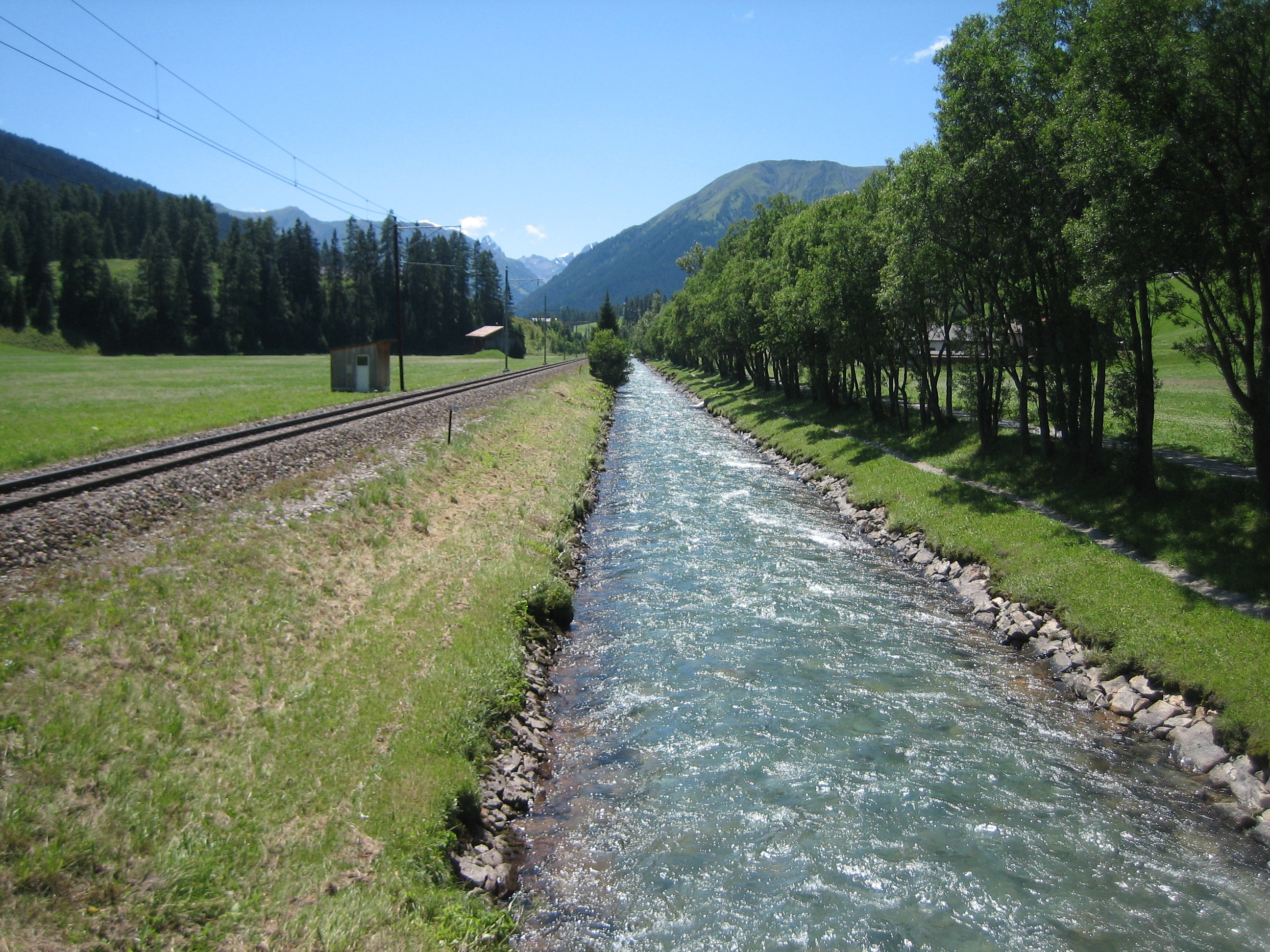
- The Landwasser on the Davoser plateau next to the RhB track between Davos Platz and Frauenkirch near In der Islen, looking downstream, south-west.

Location
- Country: Switzerland

Physical characteristics
- Source
  - location: Flüalabach, Davos Dorf, Graubünden, Switzerland
  - elevation: 1,560 m (5,120 ft)
- Mouth
  - location: Albula (river)
  - coordinates: 46°40′11″N 9°39′54″E
  - elevation: 955 m (3,133 ft)
- Length: 30.5 km (19.0 mi)

Basin features
- Progression: Albula→ Hinterrhein→ Rhine→ North Sea

The Landwasser is a river that is roughly 30-kilometre (19 mi) long and located in the canton of Graubünden, Switzerland. Its origin is in Davos from the Flüelabach and a no-longer existent stream from Lake Davos. Currently, it is fed by several streams, including the Dorfbach, the Schiabach, and the Dischmabach.

The Landwasser flows through Davos Platz, where its fed by several more streams. The Landwasser continues through the Landwasser Valley, to the southwest. The town of Davos is the largest, uppermost, and, except for the last bit, the only larger settlement on the river. The river eventually flows into the Albula River in the Albula Valley below the village of Filisur.

The Landwasser Viaduct is located on the Albula line of the Rhaetian Railway, extending over the Landwasser Valley.

== See also ==
- Landwasser Viaduct
- List of rivers of Switzerland
