= Tomasee =

Lake in Switzerland

Lake Toma (Tomasee)
- Lai da Tuma
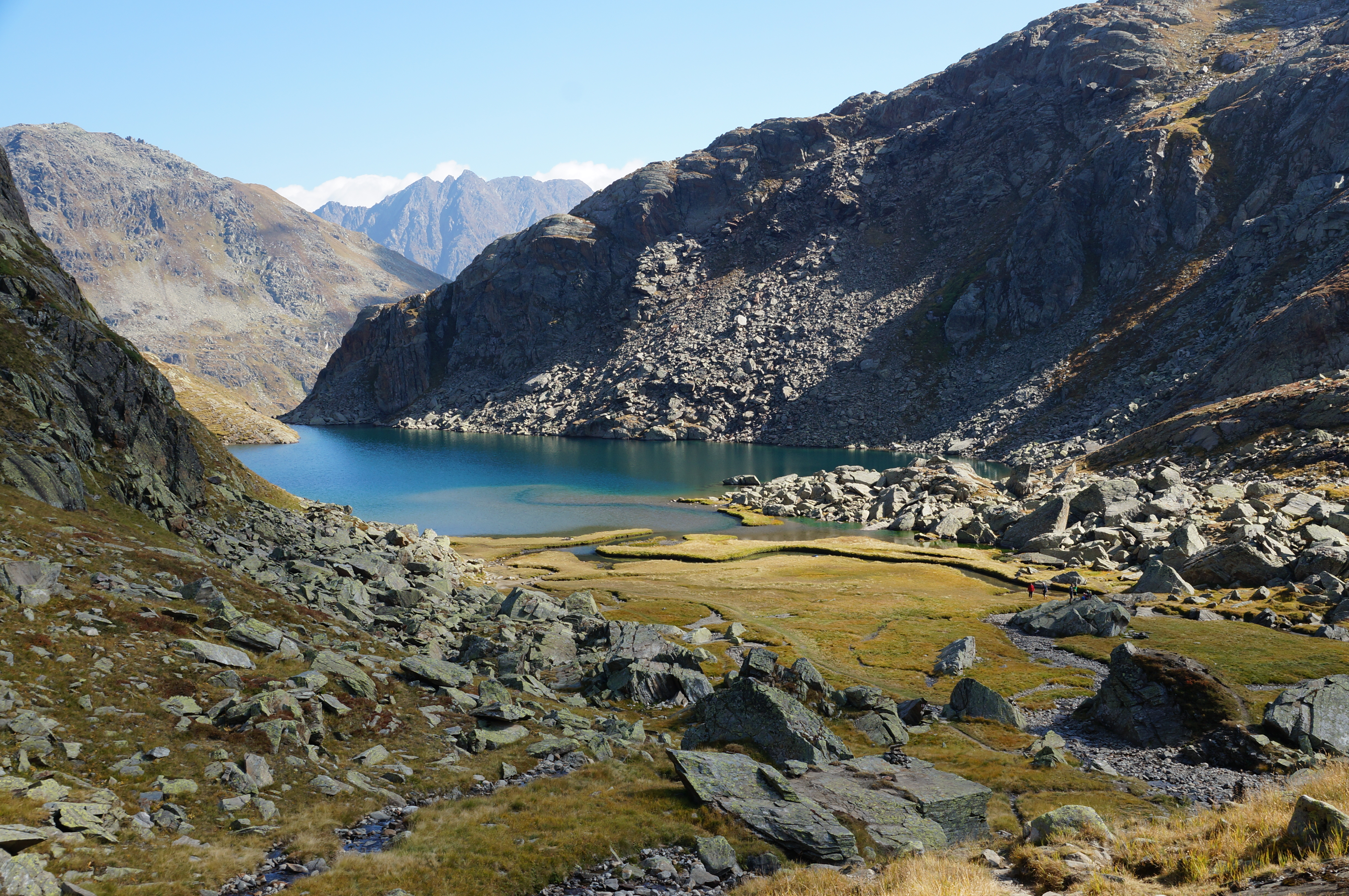

- Location within Canton of Graubünden Location within Canton of Uri Location within Switzerland Location within Alps
- Interactive map of Lake Toma (Tomasee)
- Location: Grisons
- Coordinates: 46°37′57″N 8°40′20″E
- Primary inflows: Rein da Tuma
- Primary outflows: Rein da Tuma
- Basin countries: Switzerland
- Surface area: 2.5 ha (6.2 acres)
- Surface elevation: 2,345 m (7,694 ft)

Lake Toma (German: Tomasee, Romansh: Lai da Tuma or Lag da Toma) is a lake at the northern face of Piz Badus, above the village of Tschamut in the canton of Grisons (Graubünden), Switzerland. Its surface area is 2.5 ha (6.2 acres).

It is the source of the Anterior Rhine and is deemed to be the official source of the Rhine (the source of the Posterior Rhine is above Hinterrhein, Switzerland, at 46.499°N 9.065°E).

It is possible to reach the lake on a path from Oberalp Pass, suitable for most walkers although still a mountain trail.

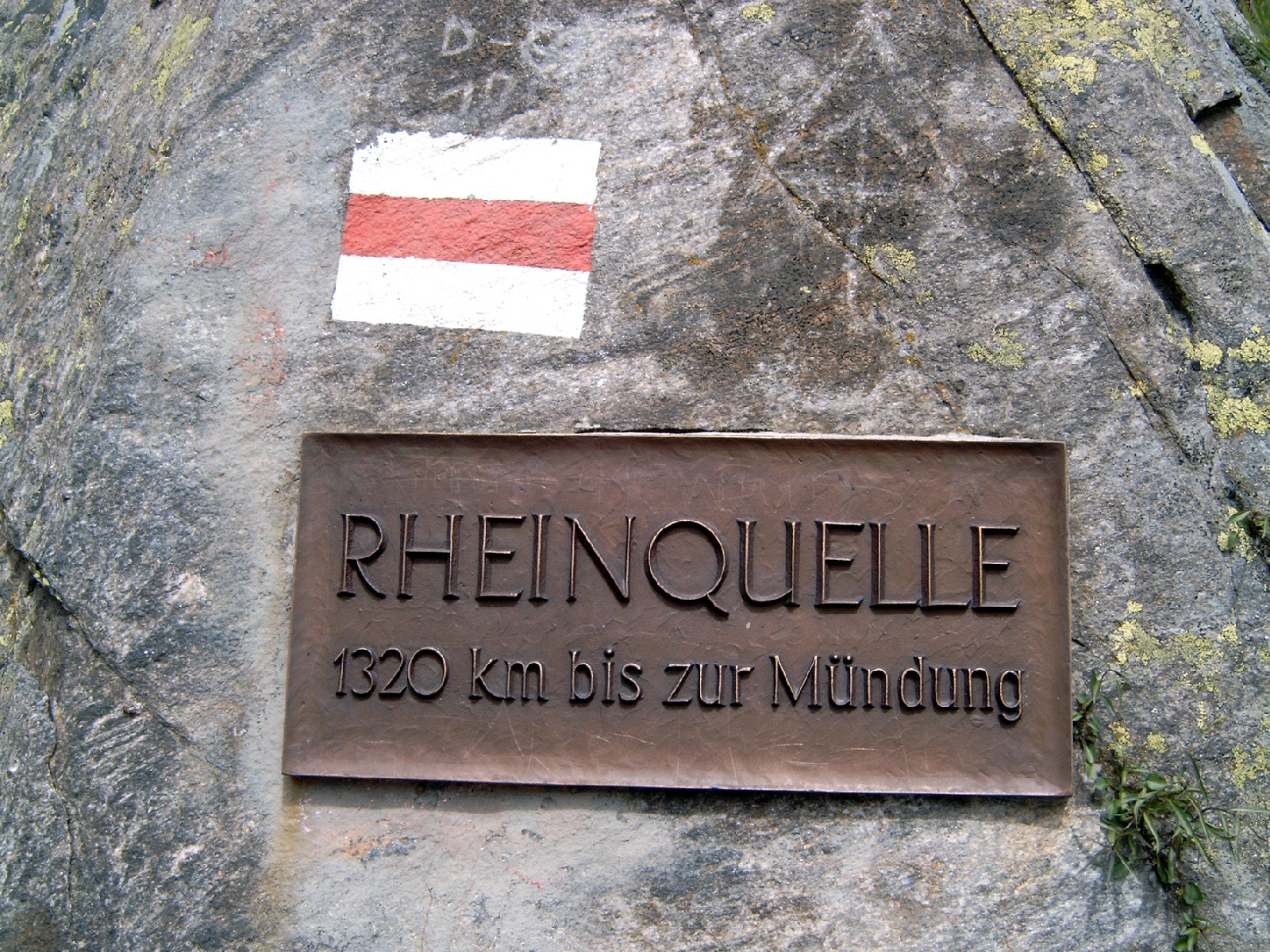
Sign for the source of the Rhine (German: Rheinquelle) near Lake Toma

== See also ==
- List of lakes of Switzerland
- List of mountain lakes of Switzerland
