= Rein da Medel =

River in Switzerland

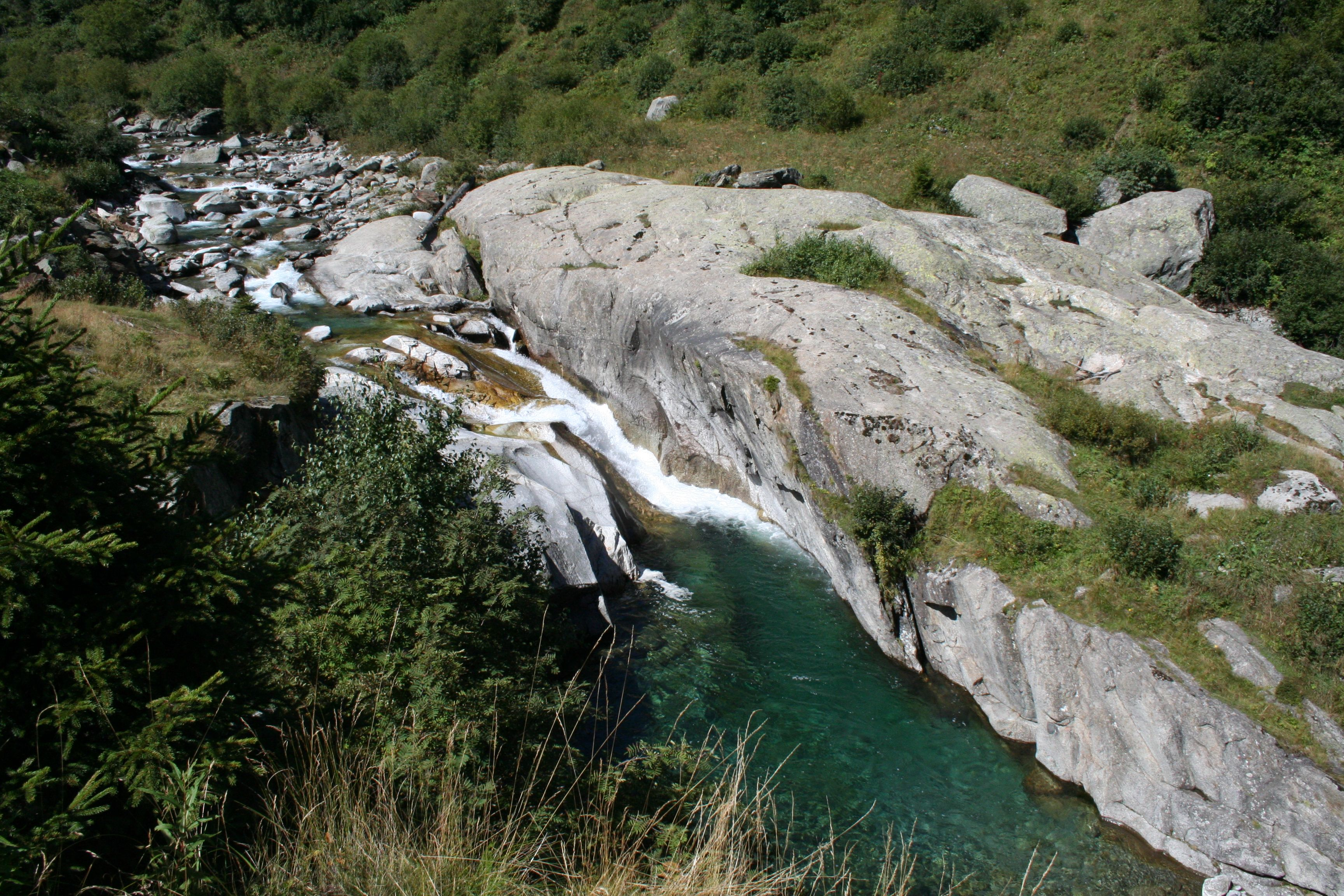
- Lower reaches of the Rein da Medel near Pardé

Location
- Country: Switzerland
- Canton: Ticino and Graubünden

Physical characteristics
- Source
  - coordinates: 46°34′10″N 8°41′44″E
  - elevation: 2,500 m (8,200 ft)
- Mouth
  - location: Confluence with Vorderrhein at Disentis/Mustér,
  - coordinates: 46°41′46″N 8°51′18″E
  - elevation: 1,047 m (3,435 ft)
- Length: 25.4 km (15.8 mi)
- Basin size: 127.7 km^{2} (49.3 sq mi)

Basin features
- Progression: Vorderrhein→ Rhine→ North Sea
- Tributaries
  - right: Rein da Cristallina, Rein da Plattas

The Rein da Medel (Italian: Reno di Medel; German: Medelser Rhein) is the longest headwater of the Rhine. It is located in the Swiss cantons of Ticino and Graubünden and flows through the valleys Val Cadlimo and Val Medel. Rein da Medel is the local Sursilvan, (i.e. Romansh) name in Graubünden, which is commonly used to denote the ticinese part as well.

The most important place along the river is the village Curaglia in the municipality of Medel.

== Course of the river ==
The headwaters of the Rein da Medel flow through the Val Cadlimo, a small west–east valley south of the main Alpine ridge in the municipality of Quinto in the canton of Ticino. This is officially Italian-speaking territory; the Italian name of the creek is Reno di Medel.

There are three almost equally strong source streams:

- The southern spring trickle flows through the Lago Scuro (2,450 m (8,040 ft) and thereafter becomes a creek, between Punta Negra and Bassa del Lago Scuro (a pass).
- The central spring trickle rises on the Bocchetta di Cadlimo (a pass at 2,533 m (8,310 ft)) and shortly thereafter flows through the Lago di Dentro (2,504 m (8,215 ft)).
- The northern spring trickles rise beneath the Pizzo Curnera (2,796 m (9,173 ft)).

The northern spring trickles are about 640 meters long. The southern and western spring creeks are about 1,000 meters from their start to the confluence before the Lago dell'Isra (2,321 m (7,615 ft)). 46.5656°N 8.7051°E.

About four kilometers to the east after the Lago dell'Isra at the end of its first valley, the Val Cadlimo, the Reno di Medel forms a steep little gorge that virtually "crosses" the Gotthard Base Tunnel about 1,600 m (5,200 ft) above it and marks the transition from the Val Cadlimo to the Val Medel. Just below, the gorge opens out, a tributary flows in from the south which comes down from the Passo dell'Uomo via the Val Termine. In this area, the Reno di Medel form the boundary between the municipalities of Quinto and Blenio. A few meters north of the inflow into the Lai da Sontga Maria reservoir (1,906 m (6,253 ft)), the boundary between Ticino and Graubünden is a straight line between Lukmanier Pass and Pizzo Scai, which ignores the local topography.

Now in the Grisons, the creek flows through the Sursilvan speaking part of the canton. The middle section of the river is called Froda; the lower section is called Rein da Medel. The name change takes place at the confluence of major tributary Rein da Cristallina down from south-east.

The middle and lower sections of the river flows through the Val Medel it created. Most of this section belongs to the municipality of Medel, except the uppermost bit lies in Ticino and the last kilometer belongs to the municipality of Disentis/Muster. Numerous small tributaries flow into the Reno di Medel throughout the entire Val Medel. The last two kilometers, just north and below the village Curaglia (1,335 m (4,380 ft)) and 500 m (1,600 ft) after the confluence with the Rein da Plattas (which come from a south-east valley of the same name), lead through a canyon named Las Ruinas (German: Medelserschlucht), where the Reno di Medel flows into the Anterior Rhine at about 1,047 m (3,435 ft) above sea level, just east below the road bridge across the Anterior Rhine on the road to the Lukmanier Pass.

== Flow lengths ==
The total flow length of the net since Medel is about 25.4 km. The lengths of the various sections are approximately:

- Southern headwater: 0.99 km
- Western headwater: 1.00 km
- Northern headwater: 0.64 km
- Reno di Medel (upper reaches of the Val Cadlimo, plus part of the middle reaches in Ticino, excluding Lai da Sontga Maria): 6.76 km
- Lai da Sontga Maria: 2.67 km
- Froda (dried part of the middle reaches without Lai da Santa Maria): 5.91 km
- Reno di Medel (lower reaches): 9.05 km

== Neighboring river basins ==
The key neighboring river basins in the Rhine system, those of the Reno Anteriur (Anterior Rhine), the Reno da Nalps and the Reno da Sumvitg and in the catchment area of the Po the rivers of Canaria, Murinascia Grande and Brenno.

== Gallery ==
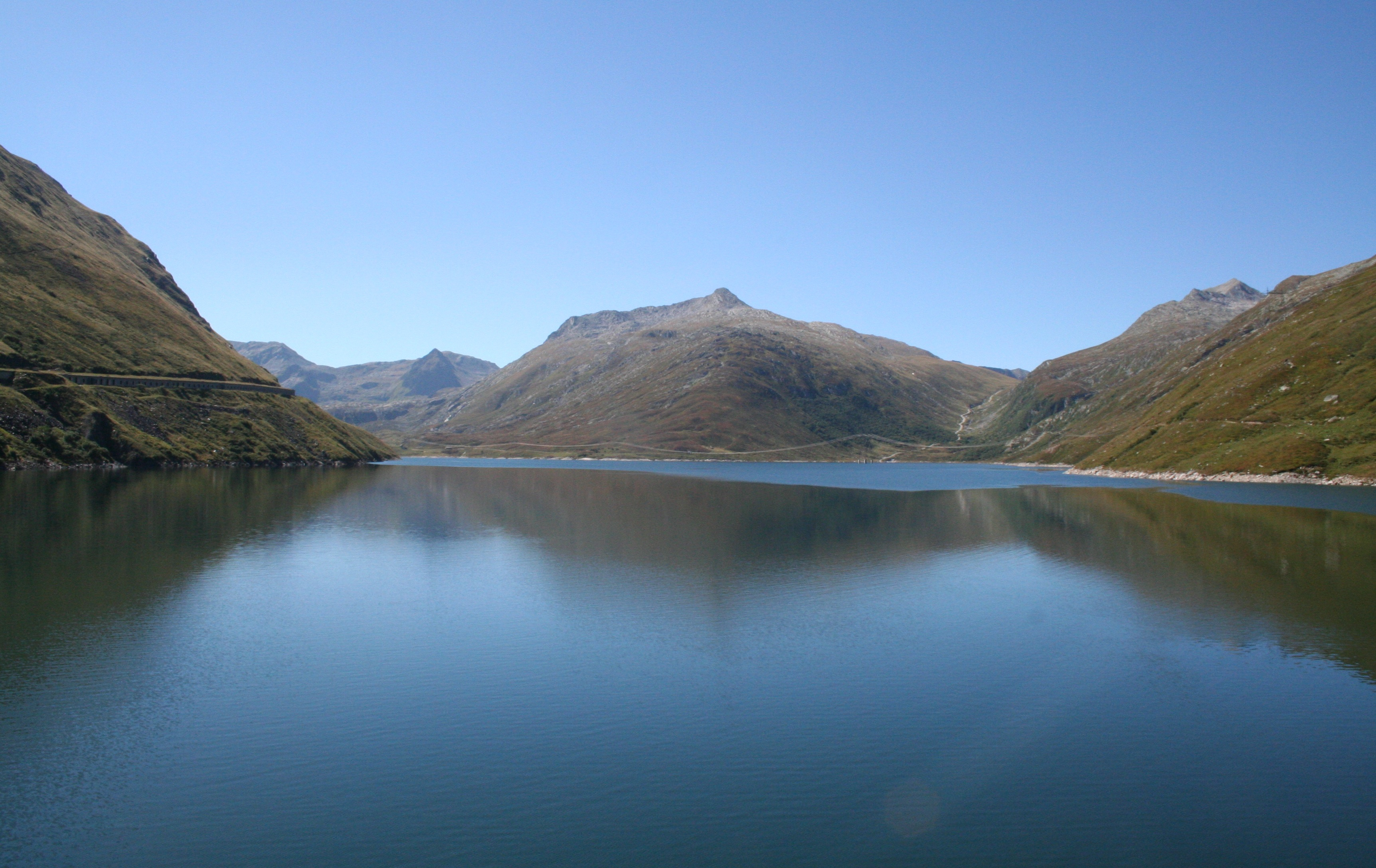
View over the Lai da Sontga Maria to the south: to the far right is the entrance to the gorge of the lower Val Cadlimo; also on the right: a view into Val Termine towards Passo dell 'Uomo; on the left: the passage towards Lukmanier Pass and the ticinese Valle Santa Maria

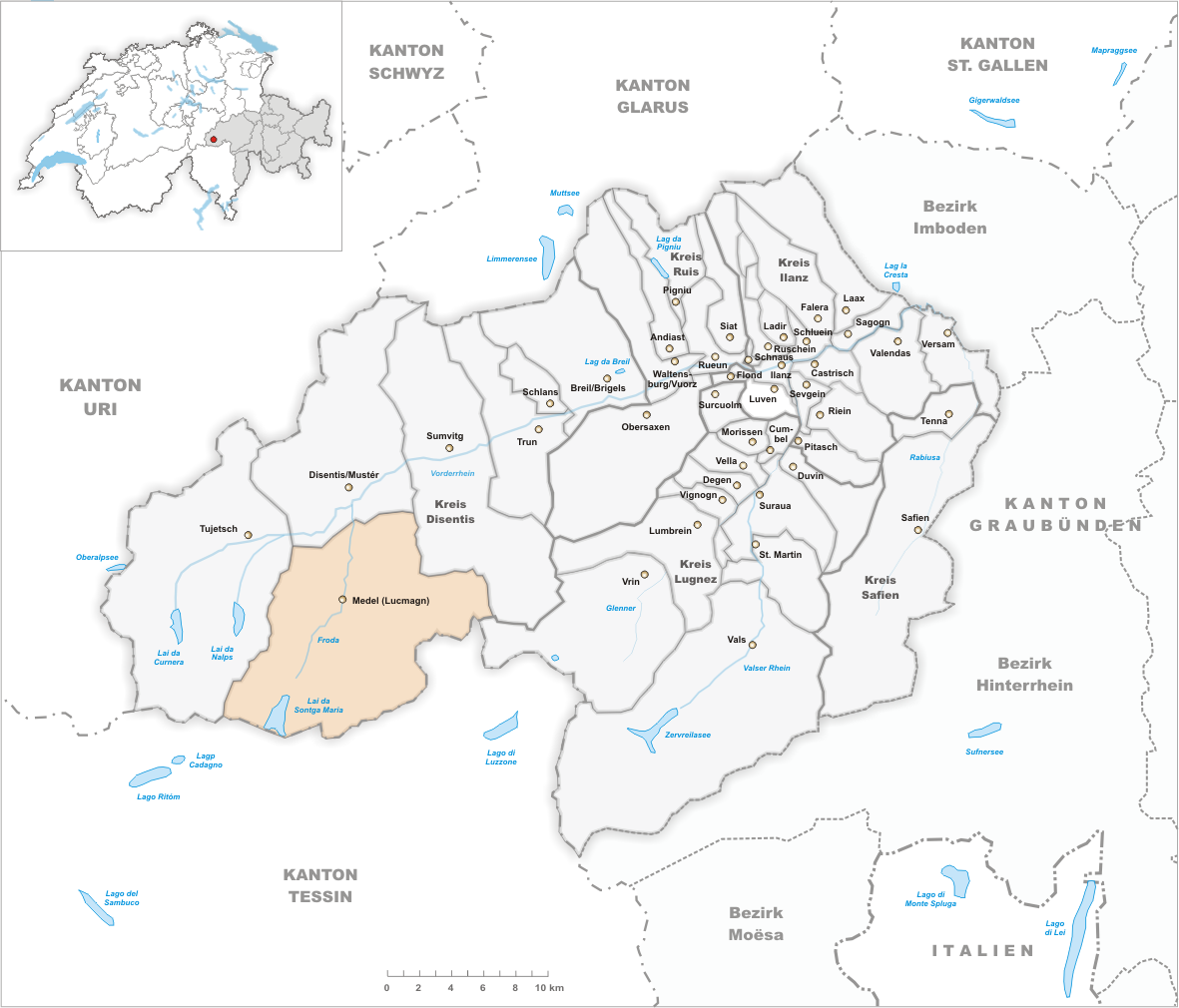
Map of the municipality of Medel, with poorly mapped Rein da Medel

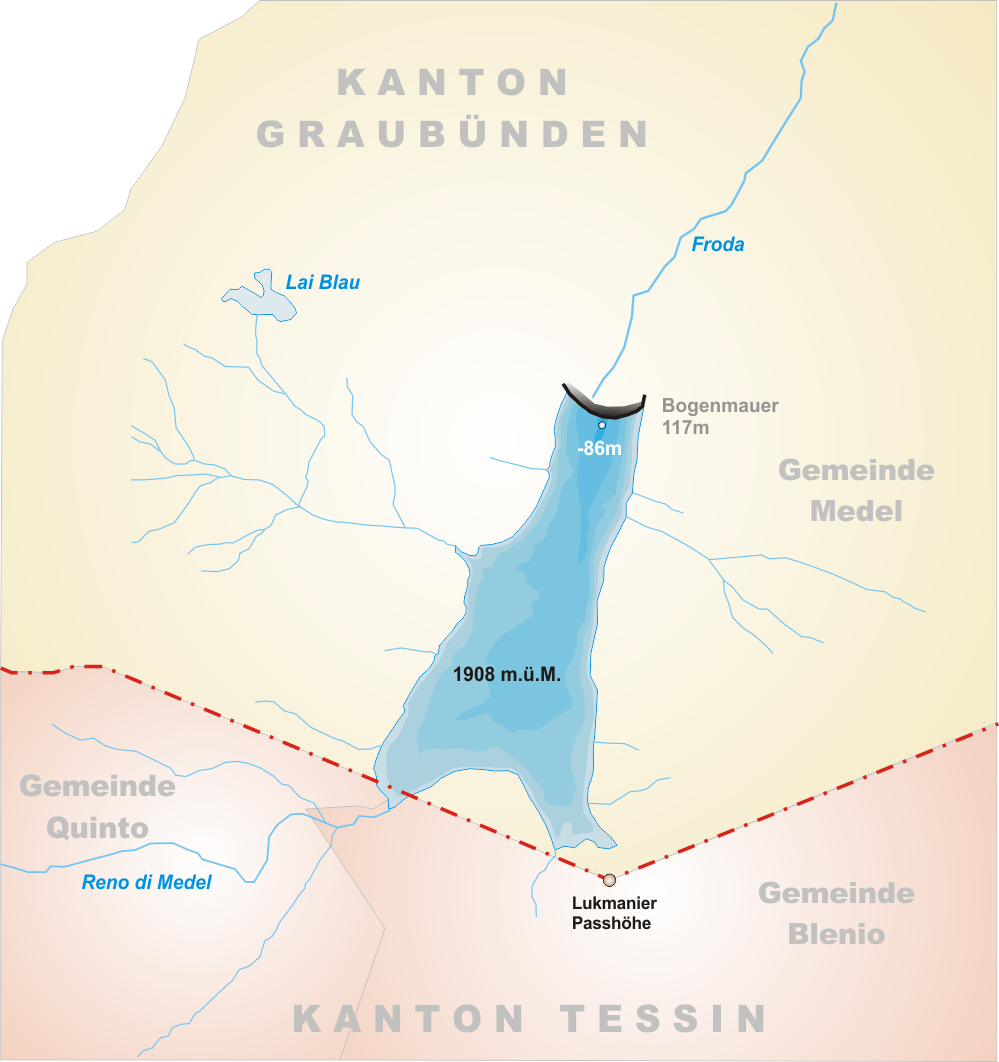
Cantonal border demarcation in the area (Olivone now belongs to Blenio).

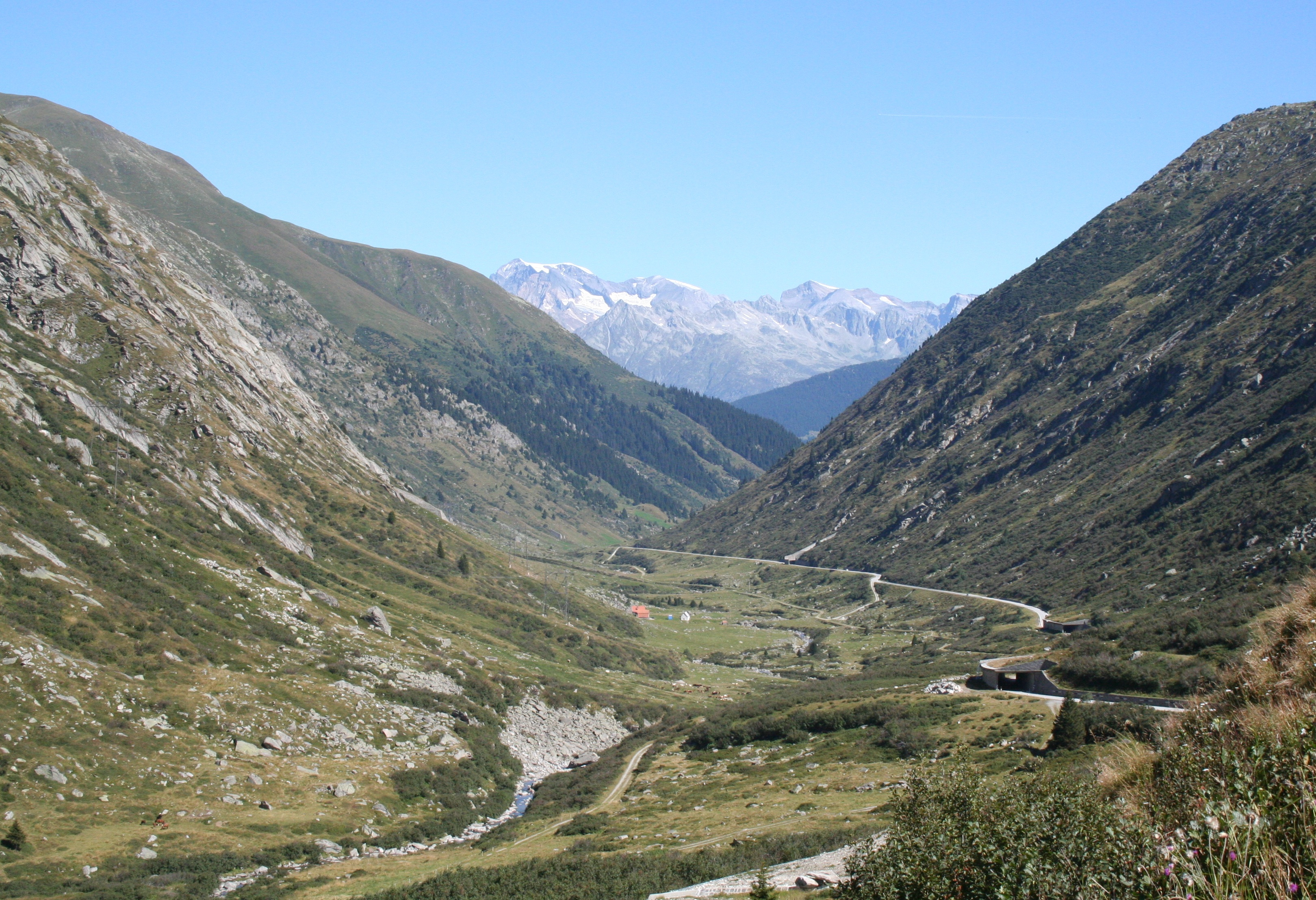
Froda (middle section of the Rein da Medel), facing north

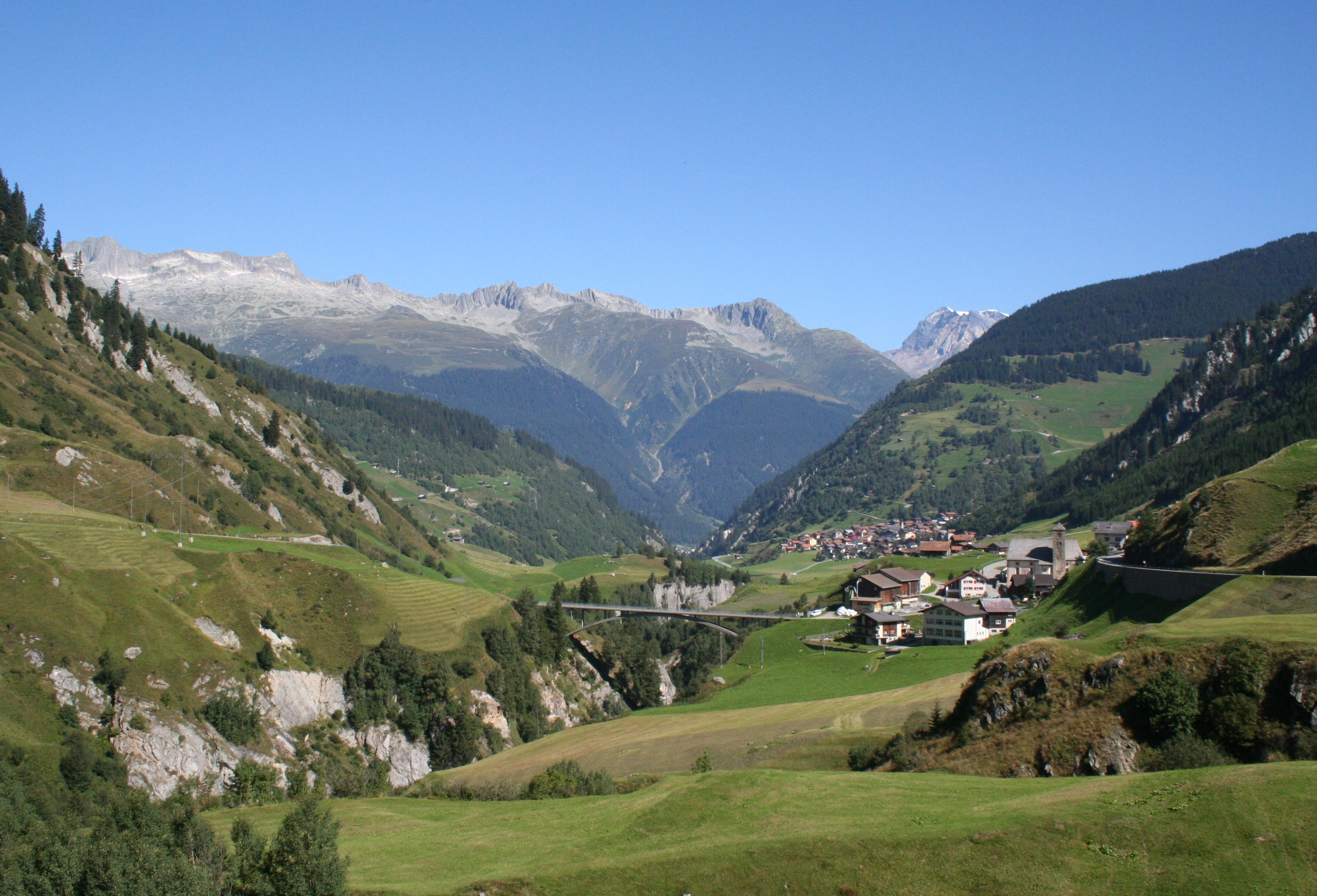
View over the lower reaches of the Rein da Medel, facing north. In the foreground Platta; in the background Curaglia. The ravine that the Rein da Medel has eroded into the bottom of the U-shaped glacial valley, is clearly visible.

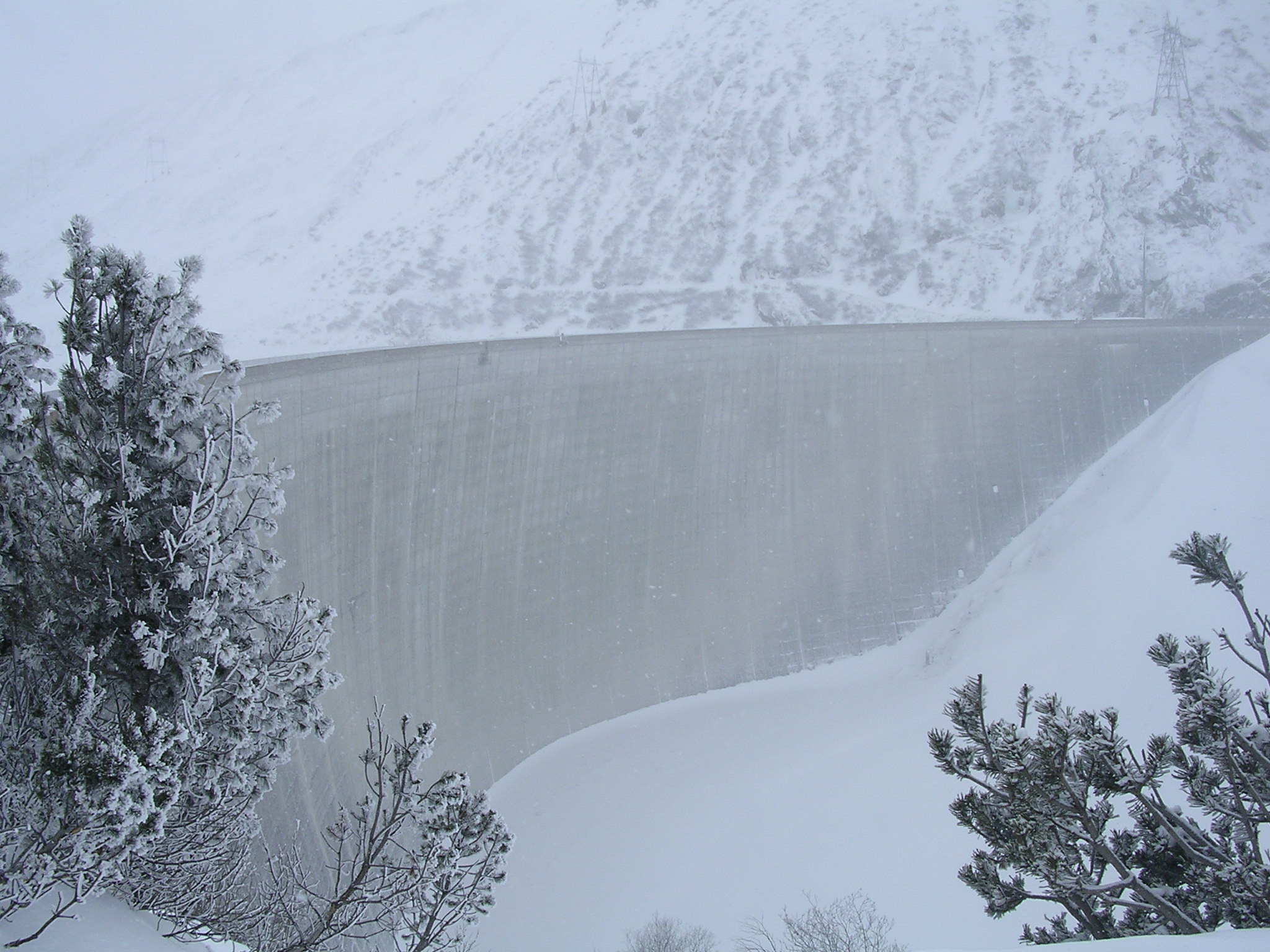
Retaining wall of the Lai da Maria Sontga

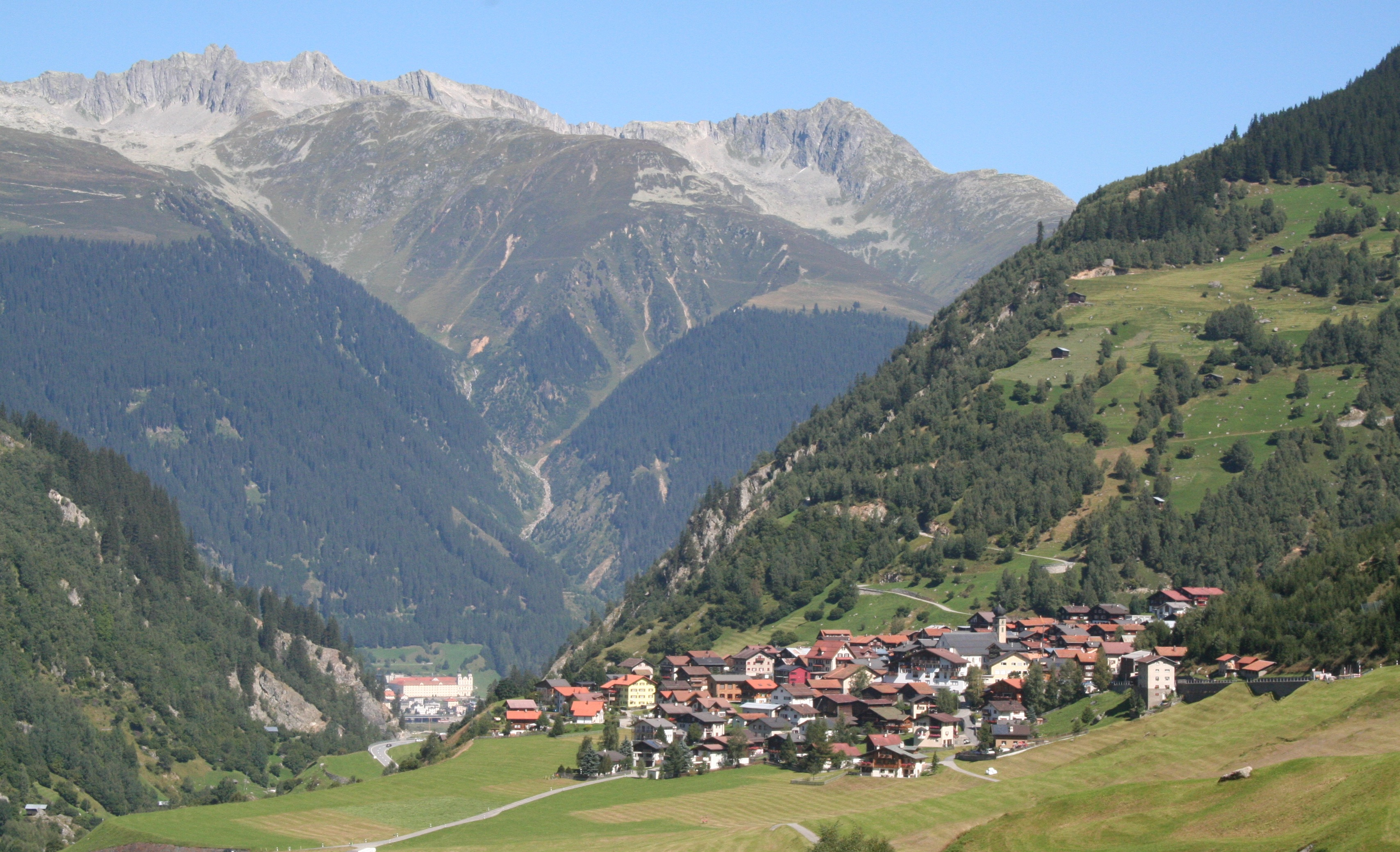
Views over Curaglia towards Anterior Rhine Valley with the Benedictine Abbey of Disentis

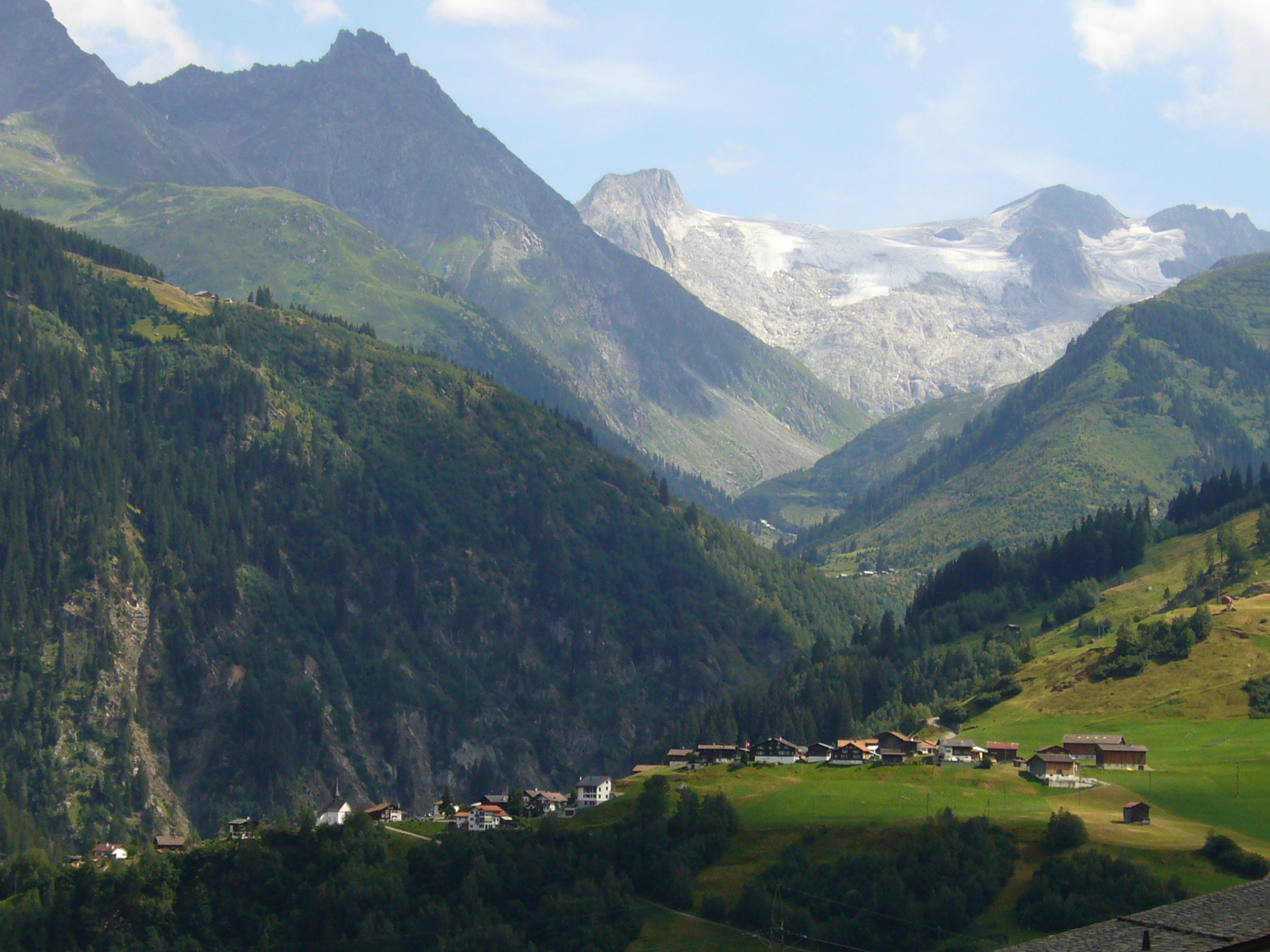
View towards Medel Glacier
