= Albula (river) =

River in Switzerland

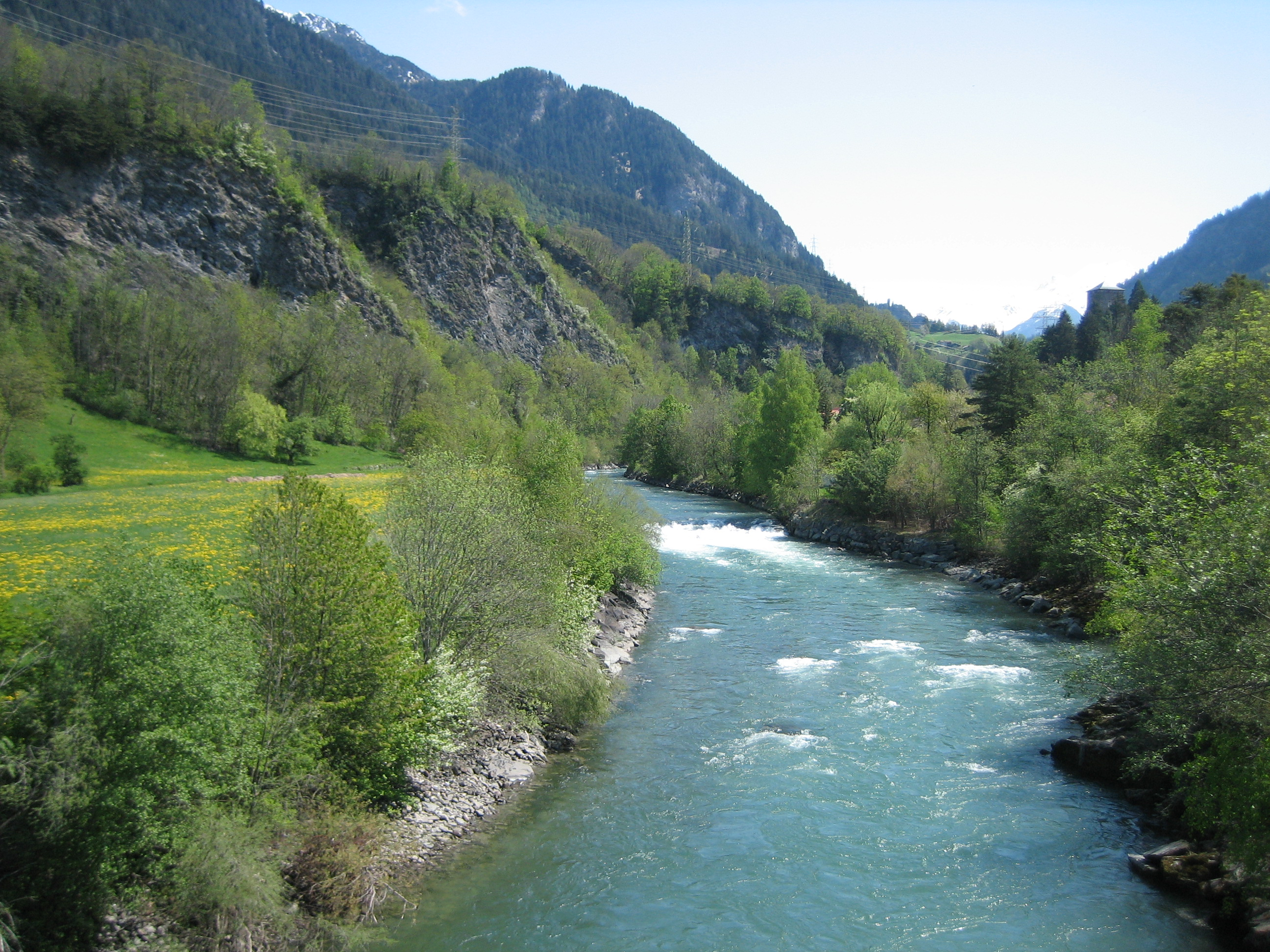

Location
- Country: Switzerland

Physical characteristics
- Mouth: Hinterrhein
  - coordinates: 46.7123°N 9.4494°E
- Length: 36 km (22 mi)
- Basin size: 950 km^{2} (370 sq mi)

Basin features
- Progression: Hinterrhein→ Rhine→ North Sea
- Tributaries
  - right: Landwasser

Albula (German; Romansh: Alvra) is a river of Switzerland, a right tributary of the Hinterrhein. It is approximately 36 kilometres (22 mi) to 39 kilometres (24 mi) long, and the basin is 950 square kilometres (370 mi^{2}). It flows into the Hinterrhein near Thusis.

The Albula River is the largest tributary of the Hinterrhein. The river's origin is the outflow of several unnamed small lakes at approximately 2,035 metres (6,677 ft) above sea level, on the western side of the Albula Pass in the Igls Plains. A damn has formed Lake Palpuogna.

== See also ==
- List of rivers of Switzerland
