= List of rivers of Switzerland =

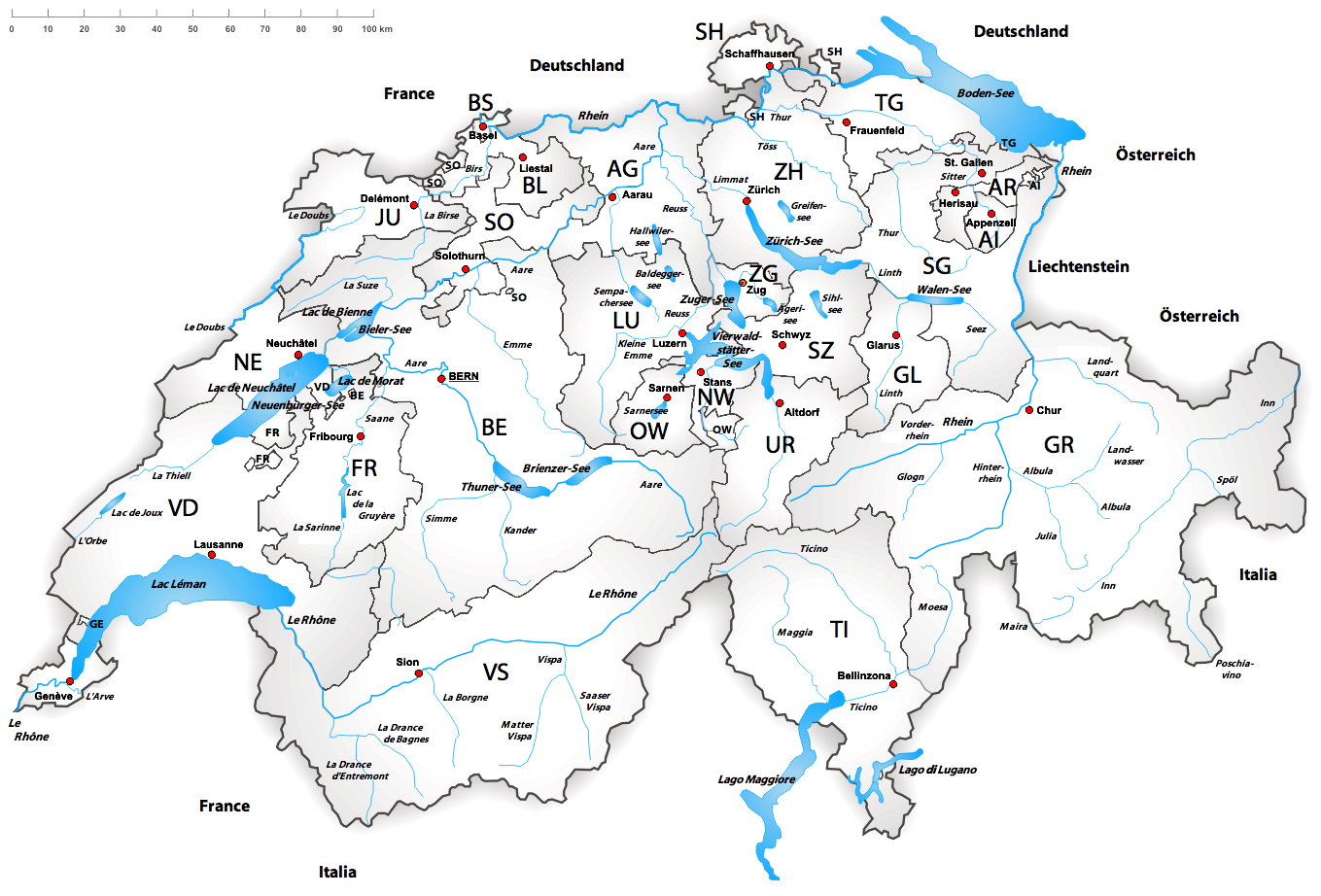
Map of Switzerland showing major lakes and rivers

The following is a list of rivers of Switzerland (and tributaries thereof). Included rivers flow either entirely or partly through Switzerland or along its international borders. Swiss rivers belong to five drainage basins, i.e. of the Rhine, the Rhône, the Po, the Danube or the Adige. Of these, only the Rhine and Rhône flow through Switzerland (and also originate there). The waters therefore drain into either the North Sea, the Mediterranean Sea or the Black Sea.

Some of the larger rivers, such as the Aare, Limmat (ZSG) and Rhine (URh), are in part navigable and include recreational boat lines.

Below, rivers are grouped by length, drainage area, orography and in alphabetical order. A list of border rivers is also given.

== Rivers by length ==
Rivers with over 100 km (62 mi) in Switzerland

Rank	River	Length (km)	Length (mi)
1	Rhine	375	233
2	Aare (or Aar)	295	183
3	Rhône	264	164
4	Reuss	158	98
5	Linth and Limmat together (Note: The Linth is the main tributary of Lake Zurich and the Limmat the lake's outflow.)	140	87
6	Thur	135	84
7	Saane/La Sarine (Note: The river is called Sarine in French and Saane in German.)	128	80

== Rivers by drainage area ==
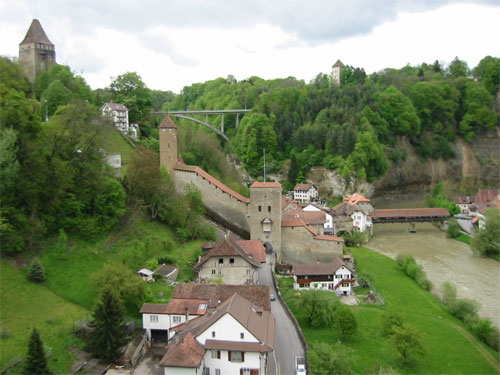
Saane/La Sarine at Fribourg

Basins covering more than 1,000 km^{2} (390 sq mi), counting only the area in Switzerland.

Rank	River	Length		Drainage area	
Rank	River	km	mi	km^{2}	sq mi
1	Rhine	375	233	36,494	14,090
2	Aare (or Aar)	295	183	17,779	6,865
3	Rhône	264	164	10,403	4,017
4	Reuss	158	98	3,425	1,322
5	Orbe and Thielle together	118	73	2,672	1,032
6	Linth and Limmat together	140	87	2,416	933
7	Inn	104	65	2,150	830
8	Saane/La Sarine	128	80	1,892	731
9	Thur	135	84	1,696	655
10	Hinterrhein (Posterior Rhine)	57.3	35.6	1,693	654
11	Ticino	91	57	1,616	624
12	Vorderrhein (Anterior Rhine)	67.5	41.9	1,514	585
13	Doubs	74	46	1,310	510
14	Kander	44	27	1,126	435

== Rivers by orography ==
The five river basins of Switzerland: Rhine with Aar sub-basin Rhone Po Danube Adige

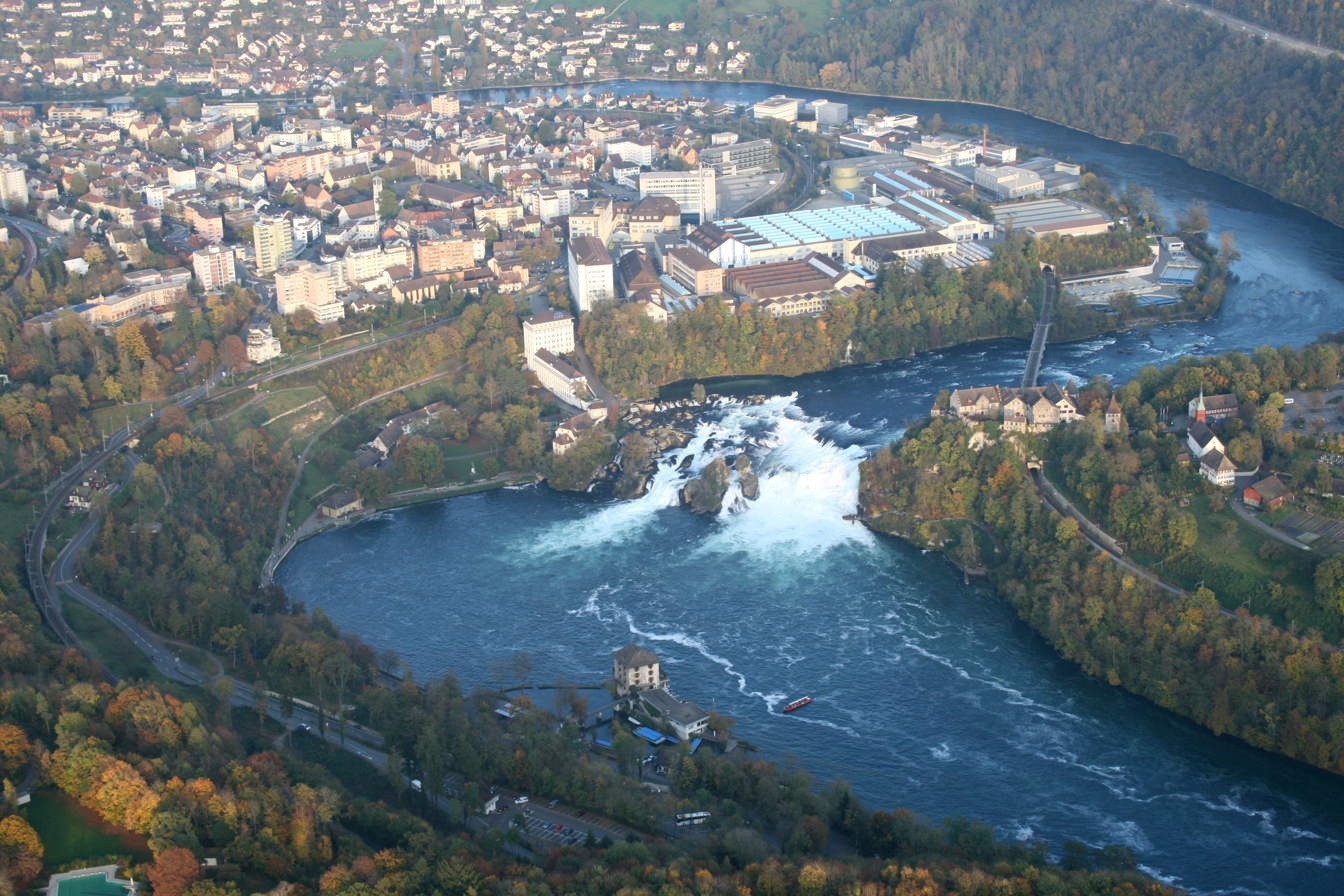
High Rhine and Rhine Falls near Schaffhausen

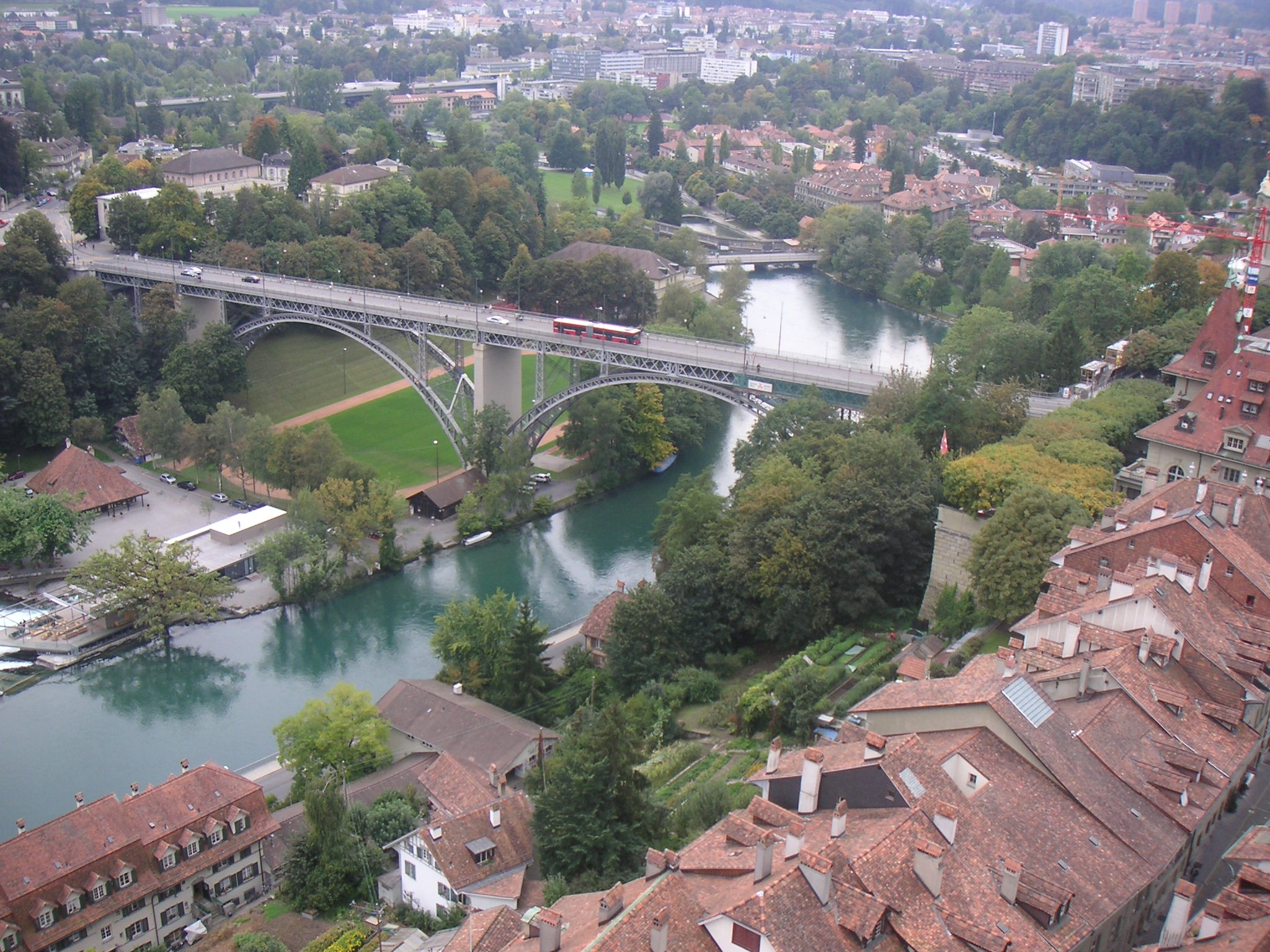
The Aare at Bern

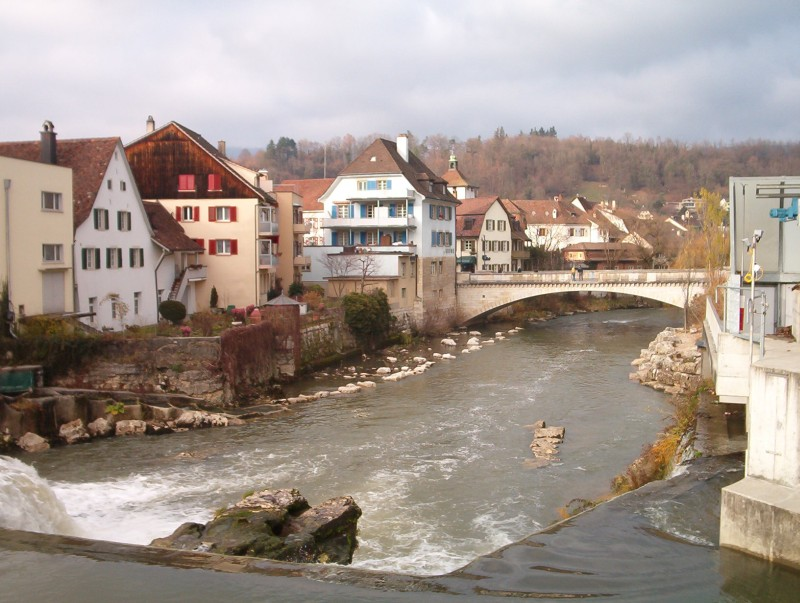
The Birs at Laufen

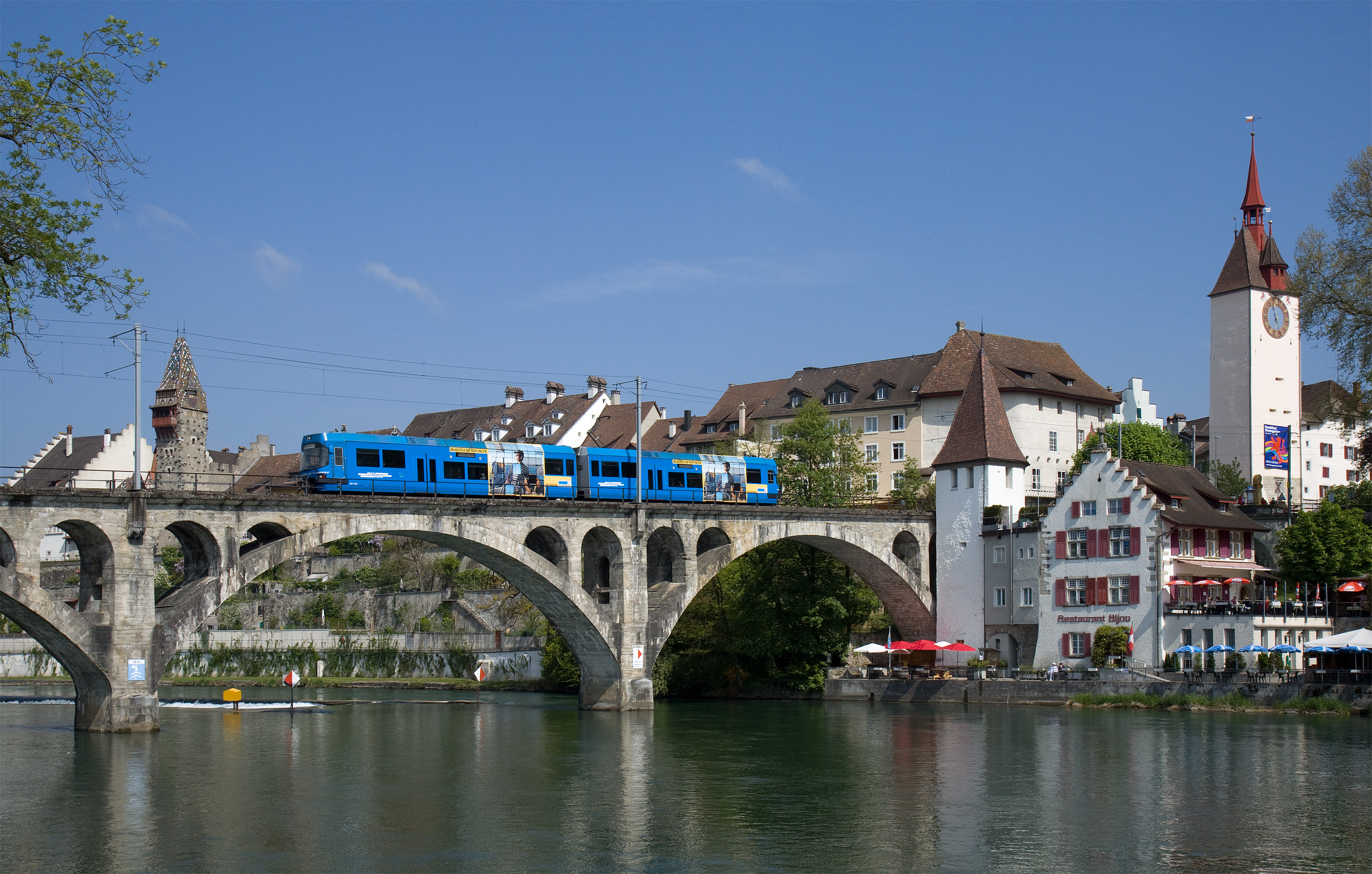
The Reuss in Bremgarten

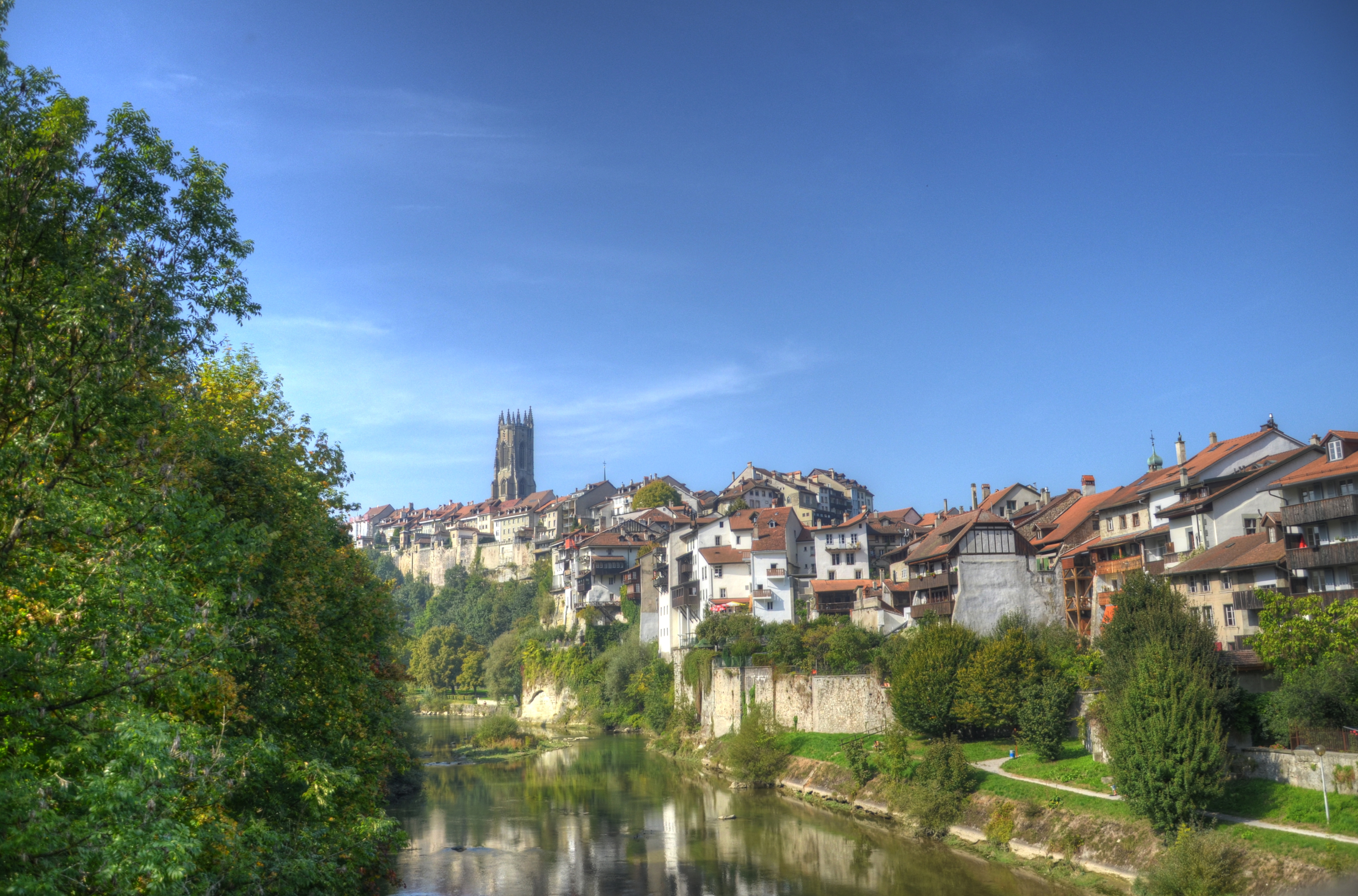
Saane in Fribourg

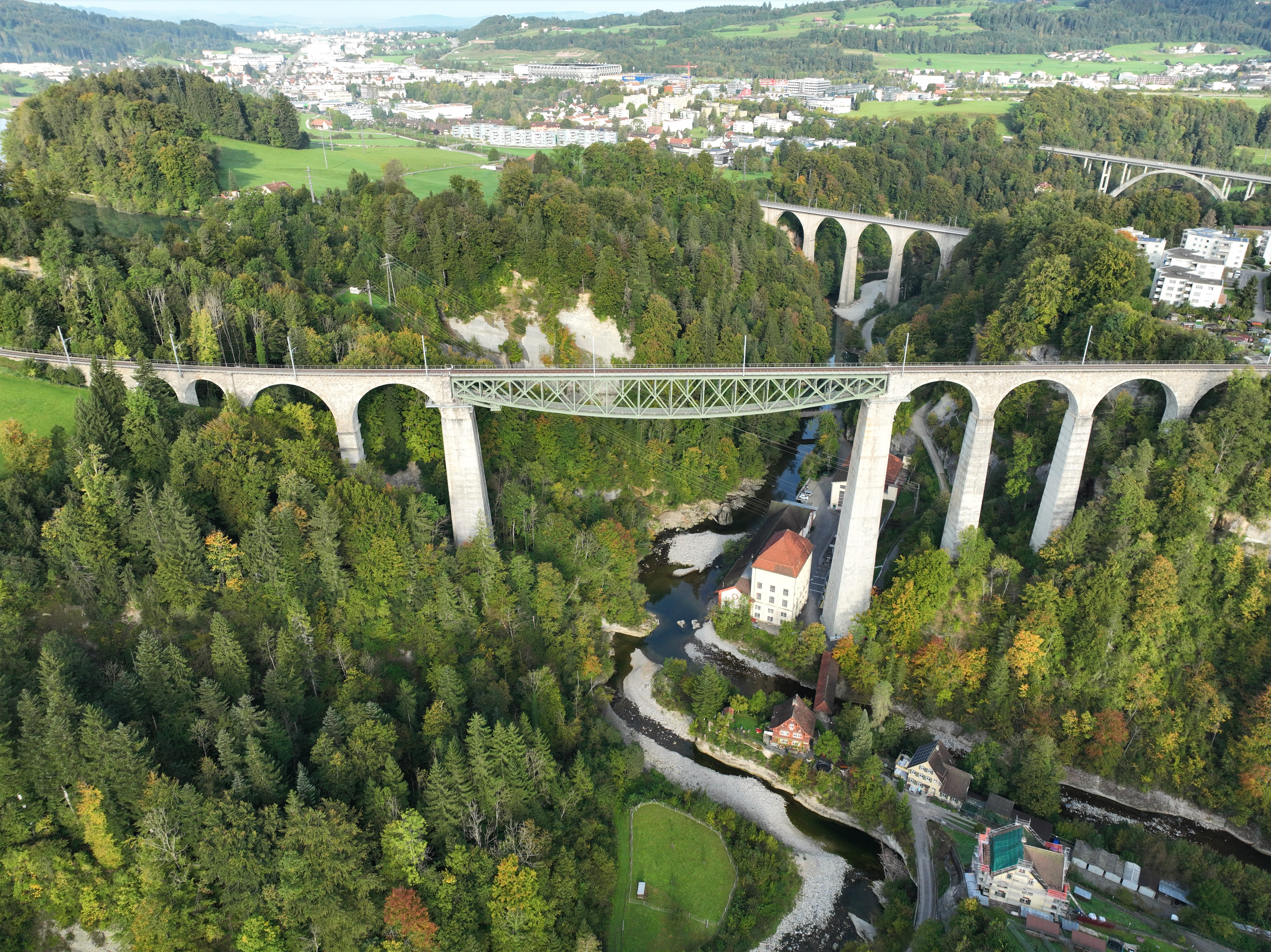
Confluence of the Urnäsch and Sitter

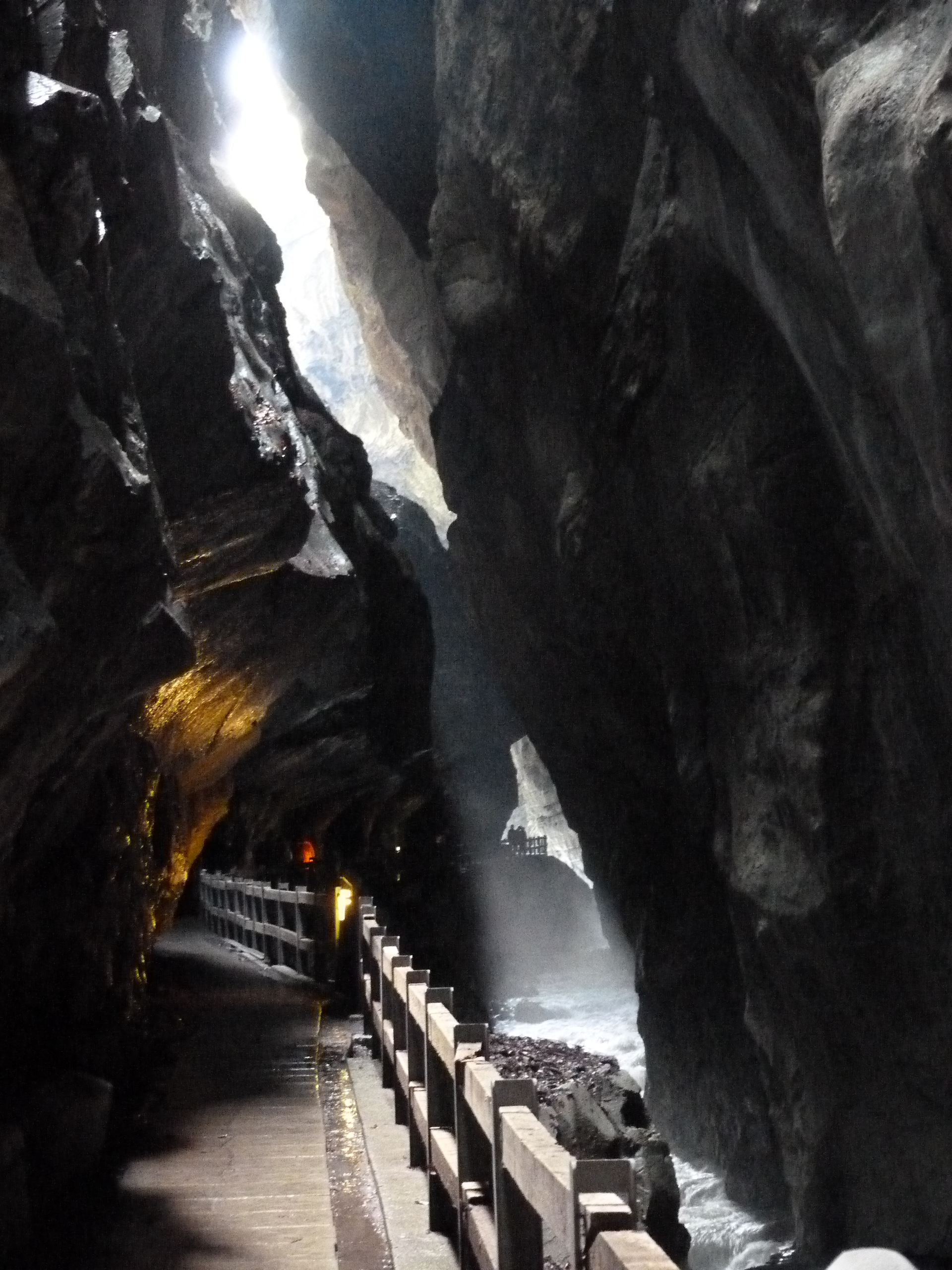
Tamina Gorge near Bad Ragaz

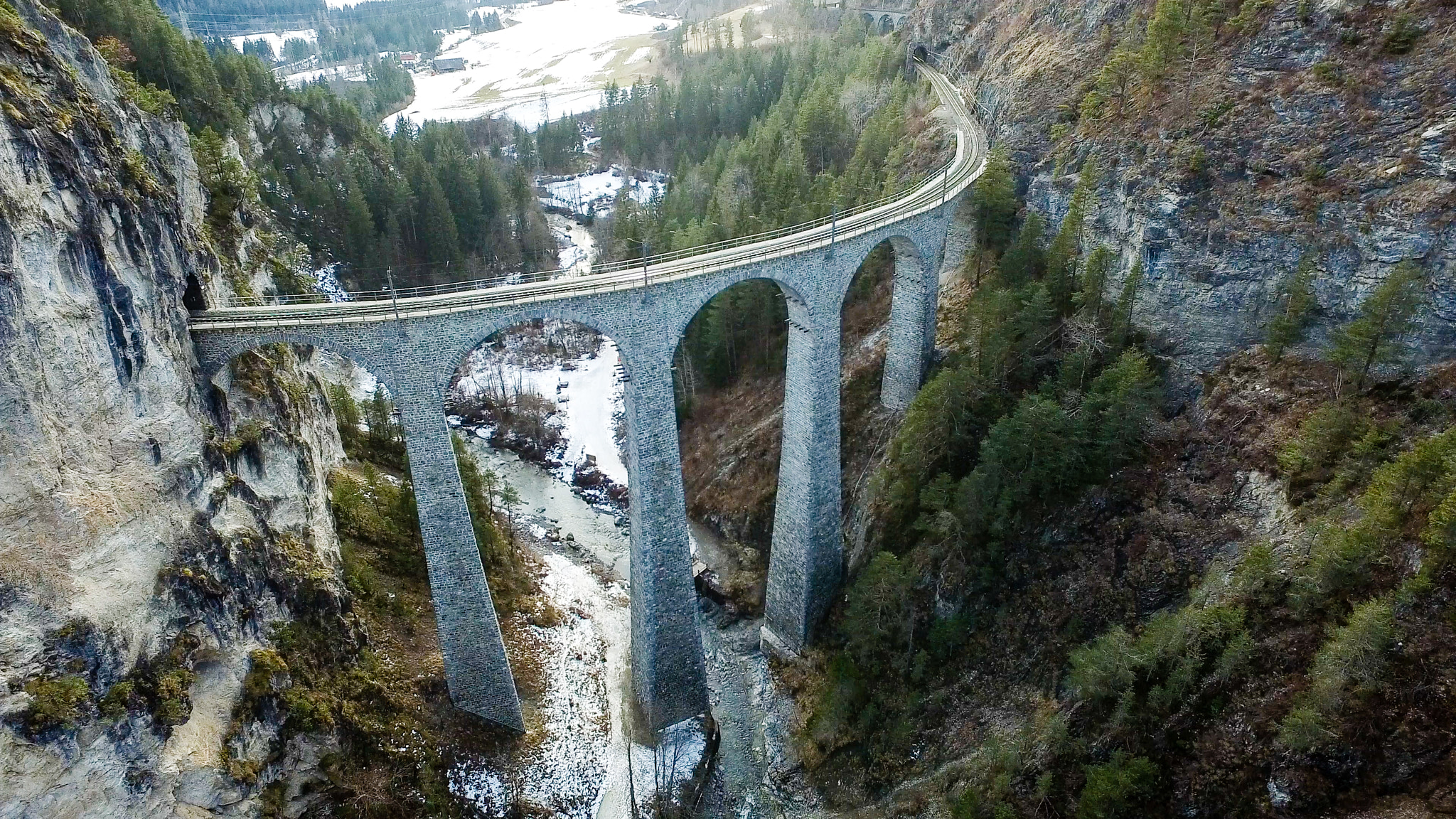
Landwasser with Landwasser Viaduct

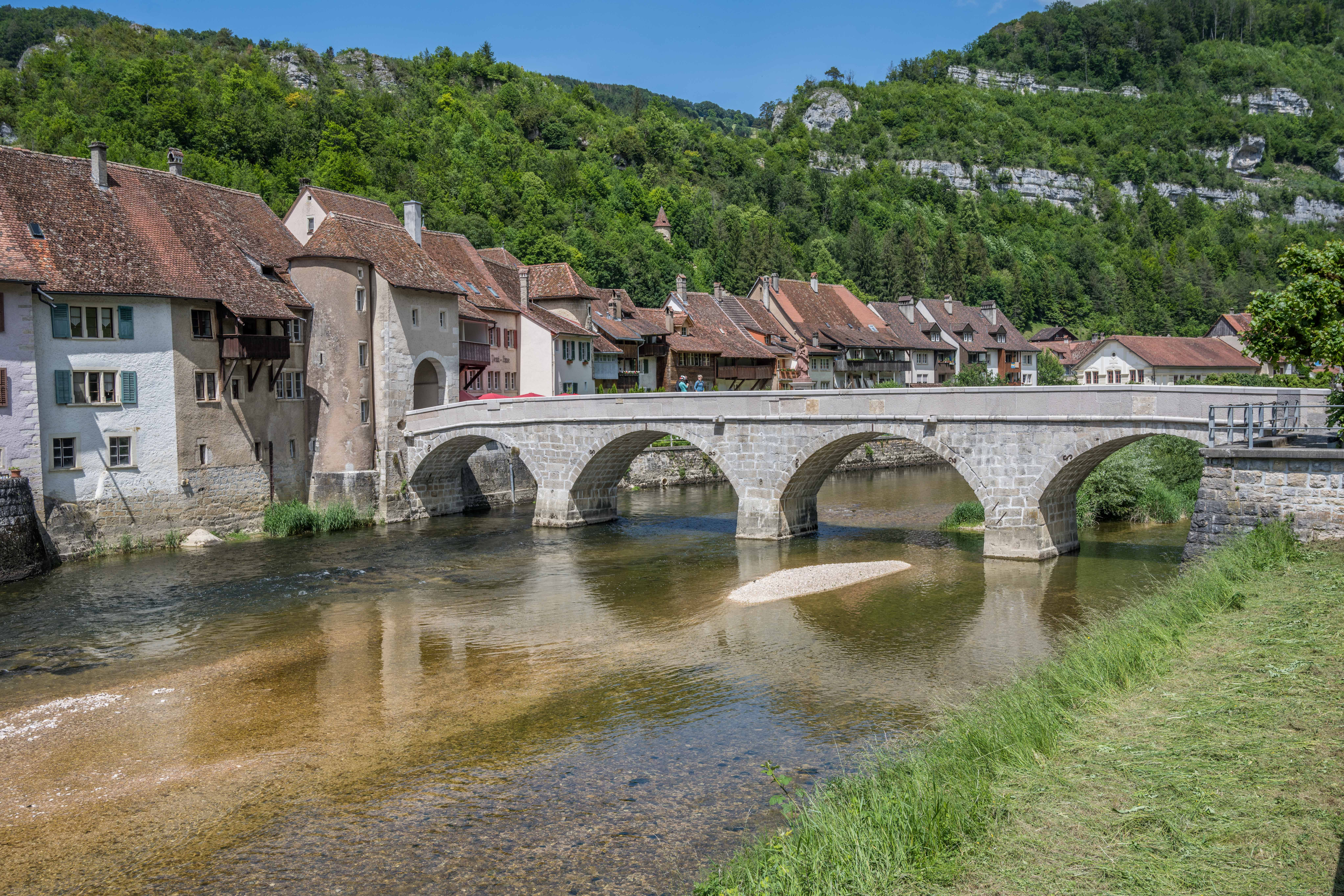
Le Doubs in Saint-Ursanne

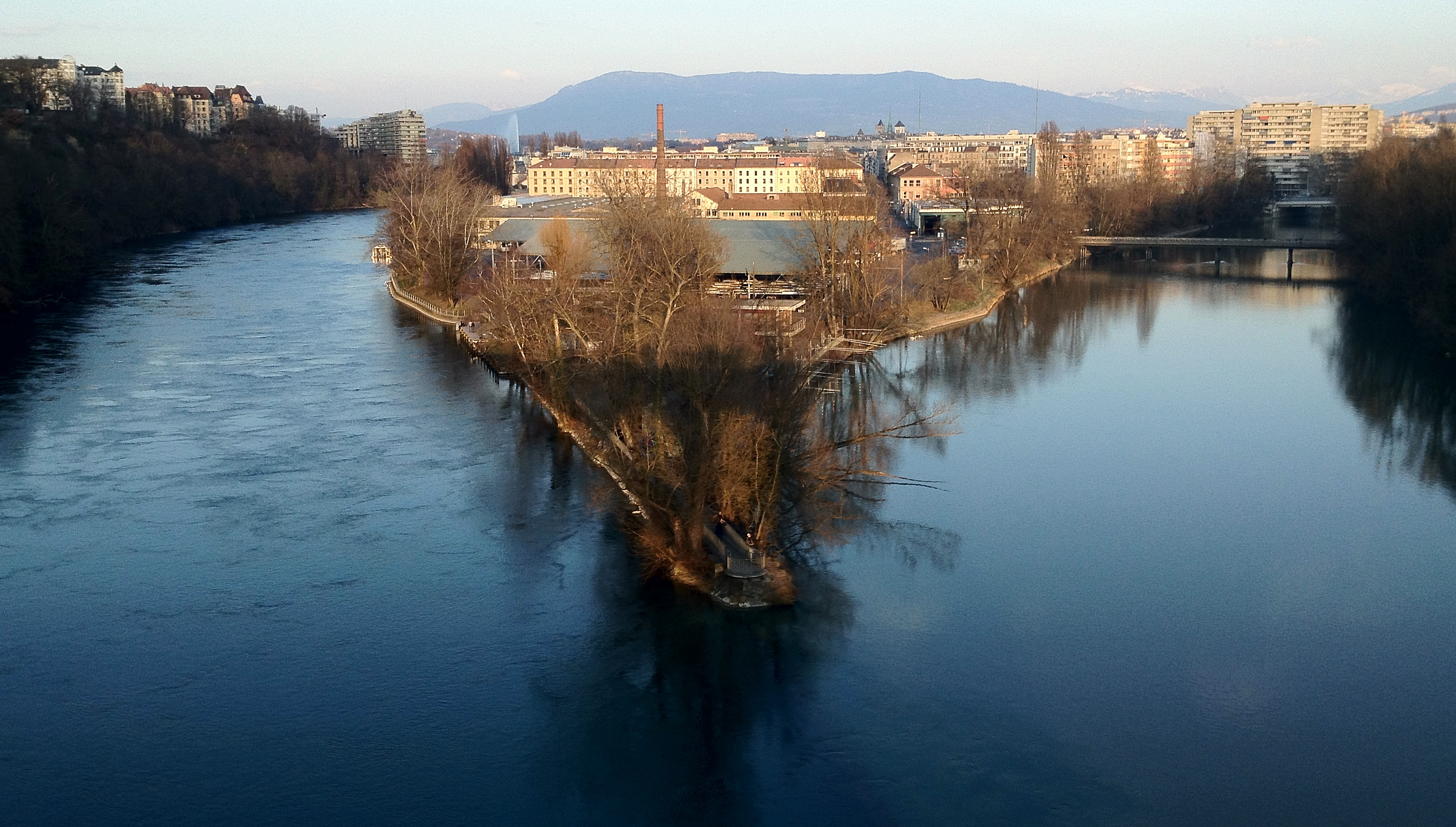
Confluence of the Rhône and Arve in Geneva

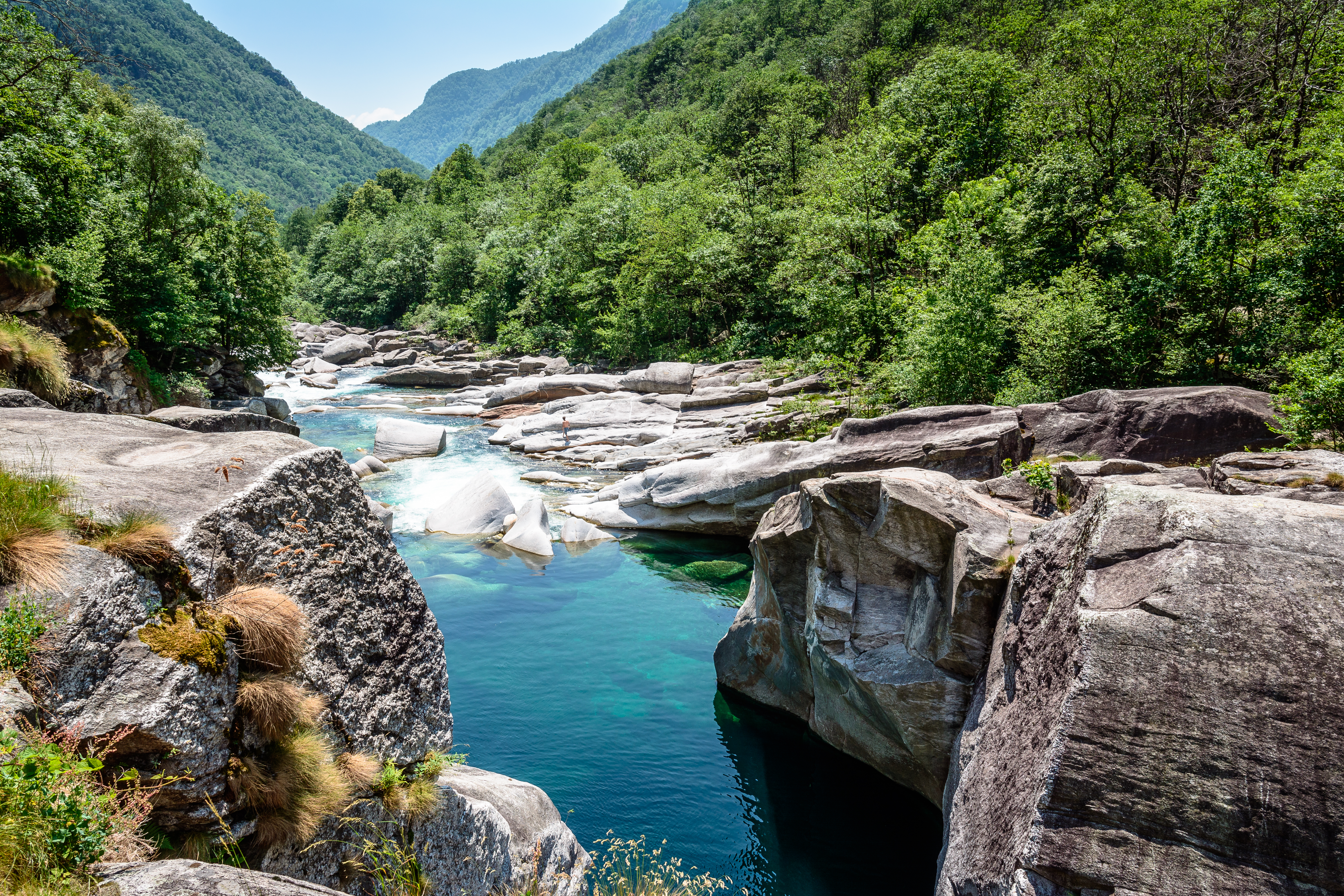
Verzasca river and valley

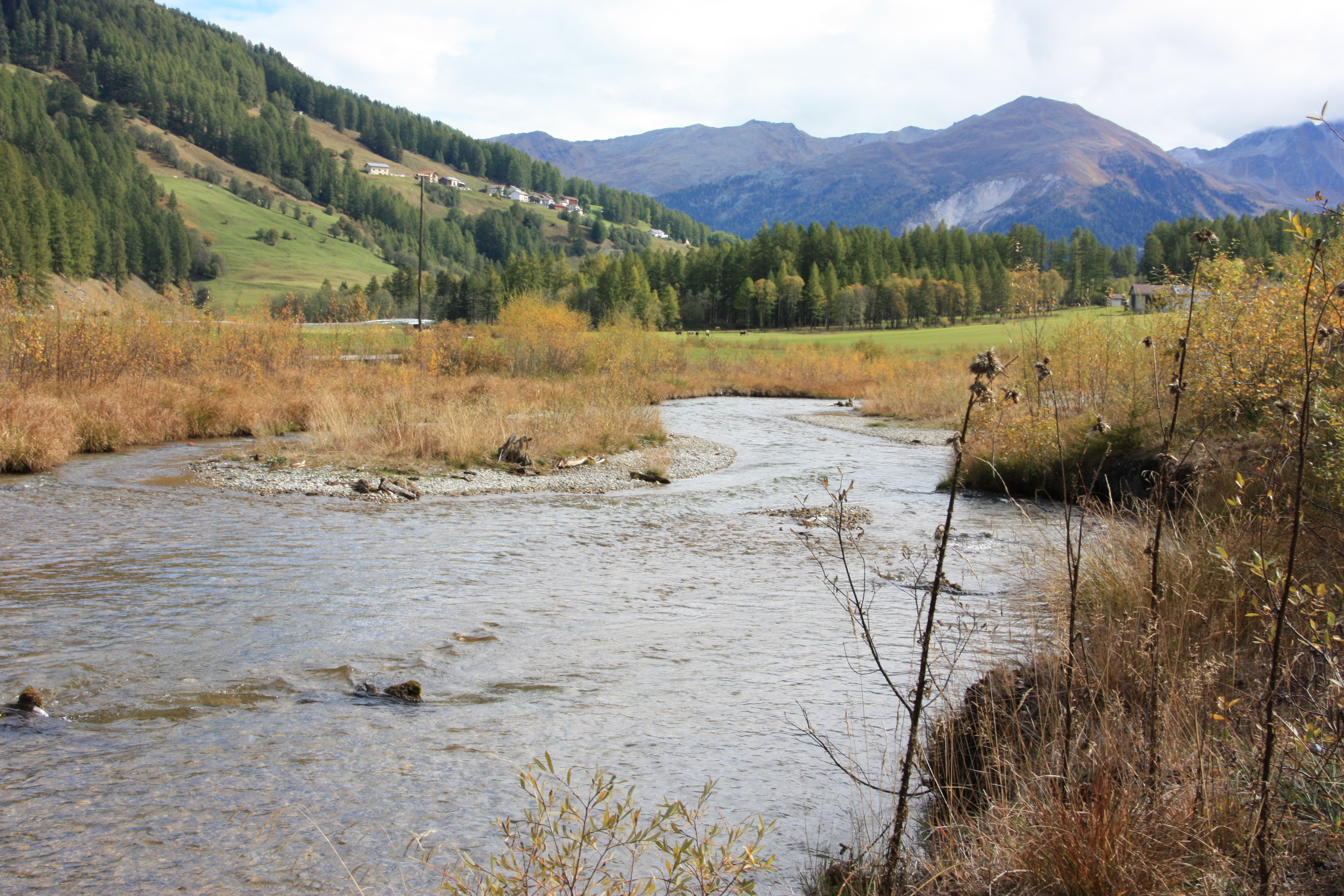
Rom near Lü

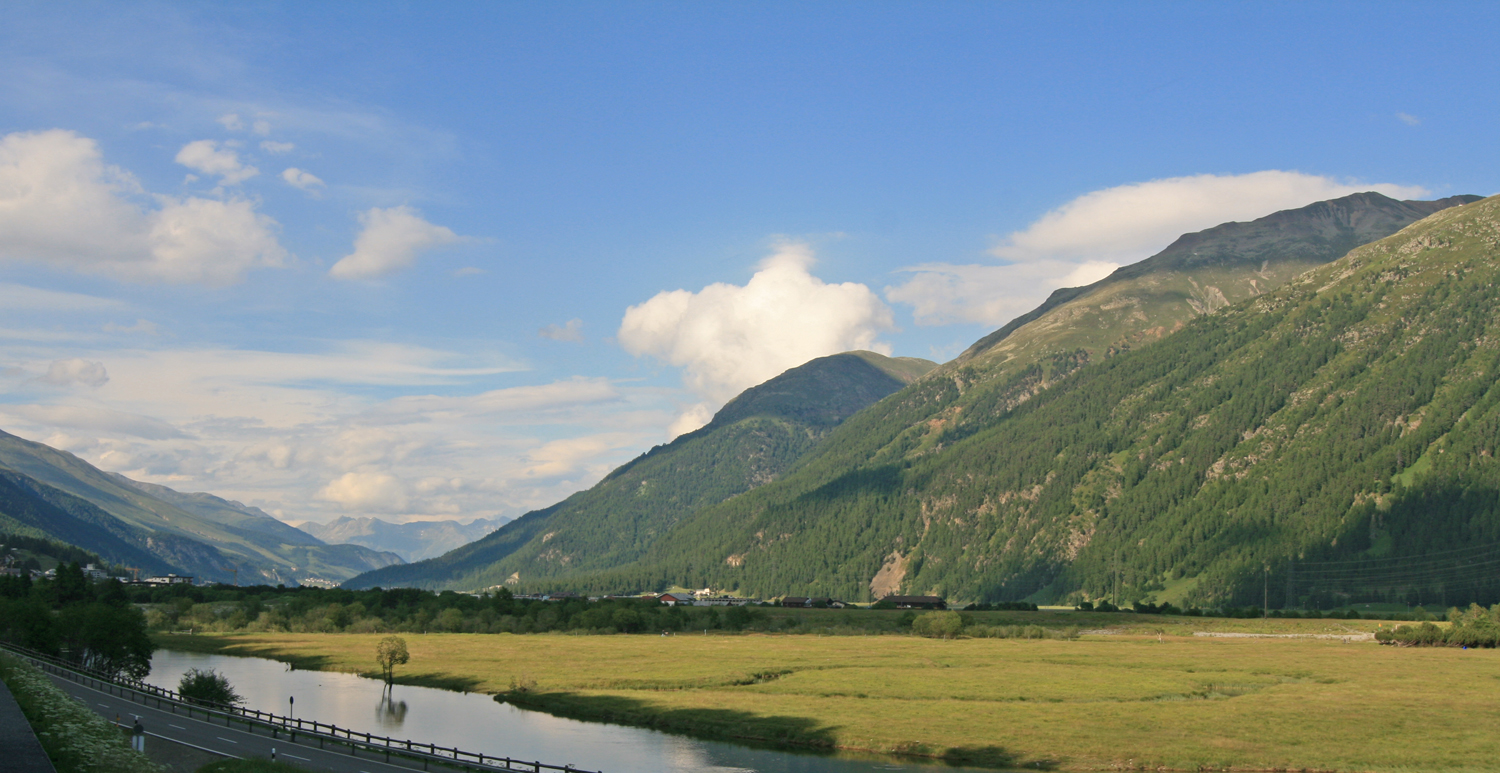
Inn in Engadin

Switzerland is drained into four directions:

- North Sea, via the Rhine.
- Mediterranean Sea:
  - Gulf of Lion, via the Rhône.
  - Adriatic Sea, via the Po and the Adige.
- Black Sea, via the Danube.

=== Drainage basins ===
Witenwasserenstock mountain is the triple divide of the drainage basins between the Rhine, Rhône and Po. Lunghin Pass is the triple divide between the Rhine, Danube and Po.

Rivers that flow into other rivers are sorted by the proximity of their points of confluence to the sea (the lower in the list, the more upstream). Some rivers (e.g. Danube) do not flow through Switzerland themselves, but they are mentioned for having Swiss tributaries. They are given in italics. The five drainage basins are highlighted in bold.

- **Rhine** (main branch in Hook of Holland, Netherlands)
  - Upper Rhine (begins at the Rhine knee in Basel)
    - Wiese - 57.82 km (35.93 mi) - 454.7 km^{2} (175.6 sq mi) (in Basel)
    - Birsig - 21 km (13 mi) - 82 km^{2} (32 sq mi) (in Basel)
  - High Rhine - 375 km (233 mi) - 36,494 km^{2} (14,090 sq mi)
    - Birs - 73 km (45 mi) - 924 km^{2} (357 sq mi) (between Basel/Birsfelden)
      - Lützel - 28 km (17 mi) - 7,884 km^{2} (3,044 sq mi) (between Laufen/Liesberg)
      - Sorne - 31 km (19 mi) - 217.65 km^{2} (84.04 sq mi) (in Delémont)
      - Raus - 8.8 km (5.5 mi) - 41.54 km^{2} (16.04 sq mi) (near Moutier)
    - Ergolz - 30 km (19 mi) - 301 km^{2} (116 sq mi) (between Augst/Kaiseraugst)
    - Möhlinbach - 15 km (9.3 mi) - 373 km^{2} (144 sq mi) (near Möhlin)
    - Sissle - 18.3 km (11.4 mi) - 128 km^{2} (49 sq mi) (in Sisseln)
    - Aare (Aar) - 295 km (183 mi) - 17,779 km^{2} (6,865 sq mi) (in Koblenz)
      - Surb - 18 km (11 mi) - 66.8 km^{2} (25.8 sq mi) (in Döttingen)
      - Limmat / Linth (Note: Prior to the regulation of the Linth (1807–1823), the river did not flow into Lake Walen but joined the River Maag, the outflow of Lake Walen, west of the lake.) - 140 km (87 mi) - 2,416 km^{2} (933 sq mi) (in Brugg)
        - Reppisch - 27 km (17 mi) - 69.1 km^{2} (26.7 sq mi) (in Dietikon)
          - Wüeribach - 7.8 km (4.8 mi) - 14.6 km^{2} (5.6 sq mi) (in Birmensdorf)
        - Sihl - 73 km (45 mi) - 341 km^{2} (132 sq mi) (in Zurich)
          - Alp - 19.3 km (12.0 mi) - 83.38 km^{2} (32.19 sq mi) (near Biberbrugg)
          - Minster - 13 km (8.1 mi) - 62.72 km^{2} (24.22 sq mi) (into Lake Sihl near Euthal)
            - Waag - 7.9 km (4.9 mi) - 23.81 km^{2} (9.19 sq mi) (near Oberiberg)
        - Küsnachter Dorfbach - 8 km (5.0 mi) - 12 km^{2} (4.6 sq mi) (into Lower Lake Zurich in Küsnacht)
        - Jona - 18.8 km (11.7 mi) - 78.4 km^{2} (30.3 sq mi) (into Obersee near Jona)
        - Wägitaler Aa - 14.3 km (8.9 mi) - 90.15 km^{2} (34.81 sq mi) (into Obersee near Lachen)
        - Seerenbach (into Lake Walen near Amden)
        - Seez - 33 km (21 mi) - 203.73 km^{2} (78.66 sq mi) (into Lake Walen near Walenstadt)
        - Sernf - 18.9 km (11.7 mi) - 210.14 km^{2} (81.14 sq mi) (in Schwanden)
      - Reuss - 158 km (98 mi) - 3,425 km^{2} (1,322 sq mi) (in Brugg)
        - Lorze - 27 km (17 mi) - 298.88 km^{2} (115.40 sq mi) (near Maschwanden)
        - Kleine Emme - 58 km (36 mi) - 477 km^{2} (184 sq mi) (near Luzern)
        - Sarner Aa - 10.4 km (6.5 mi) - 336.21 km^{2} (129.81 sq mi) (into Lake Lucerne near Alpnach)
        - Engelberger Aa - 38 km (24 mi) - 229.07 km^{2} (88.44 sq mi) (into Lake Lucerne at Buochs)
        - Muota - 33 km (21 mi) - 316.99 km^{2} (122.39 sq mi) (into Lake Lucerne at Brunnen)
        - Schächen - 18.8 km (11.7 mi) - 108 km^{2} (42 sq mi) (near Attinghausen)
      - Hallwiler Aa - 39 km (24 mi) - 302.7 km^{2} (116.9 sq mi) (in Möriken-Wildegg)
      - Suhre/Sure (Note: The river is called Sure in the Luzern and Suhre in Aargau.) - 34 km (21 mi) - 368.29 km^{2} (142.20 sq mi) (near Aarau)
        - Wyna - 32 km (20 mi) - 120.95 km^{2} (46.70 sq mi) (in Suhr)
      - Wigger - 41 km (25 mi) - 380.29 km^{2} (146.83 sq mi) (between Rothrist/Aarburg)
      - Emme - 80 km (50 mi) - 983 km^{2} (380 sq mi) (in Solothurn)
        - Urtene - 19.3 km (12.0 mi) - 97 km^{2} (37 sq mi) (near Bätterkinden)
        - Ilfis - 21.5 km (13.4 mi) - 188 km^{2} (73 sq mi) (near Langnau im Emmental)
      - Suze - 43 km (27 mi) - 216.27 km^{2} (83.50 sq mi) (into Lake Biel in Biel/Bienne)
      - Orbe / Thielle (Note: The Thielle begins at the confluence of the rivers Orbe and Talent.) - 57 km (35 mi) - 488 km^{2} (188 sq mi) (into Lake Biel in La Neuveville)
        - Broye - 86 km (53 mi) - 850 km^{2} (330 sq mi) (into Lake Neuchâtel in La Sauge)
      - Saane/La Sarine - 128 km (80 mi) - 1,892 km^{2} (731 sq mi) (near Bern)
        - Sense - 36 km (22 mi) - 434 km^{2} (168 sq mi) (near Laupen)
        - Glâne - 36.9 km (22.9 mi) - 193 km^{2} (75 sq mi) (near Villars-sur-Glâne)
      - Kander - 44 km (27 mi) - 1,126 km^{2} (435 sq mi) (into Lake Thun near Thun)
        - Simme - 53 km (33 mi) - 594 km^{2} (229 sq mi) (in Wimmis)
      - Lütschine (into Lake Brienz near Interlaken)
    - Wutach (Note: The Wutach flows mostly through Germany, but for about 6 km (3.7 mi) it forms the Germany–Switzerland border.) - 91.1 km (56.6 mi) - 1,139.3 km^{2} (439.9 sq mi) (in Waldshut-Tiengen, Germany)
      - Klingengraben - 23.4 km (14.5 mi) - 165.51 km^{2} (63.90 sq mi) (in Oberlauchringen, Germany)
        - Schwarzbach - 17.5 km (10.9 mi) - 64.056 km^{2} (24.732 sq mi) (near Lauchringen, Germany)
    - Glatt - 67 km (42 mi) - 416 km^{2} (161 sq mi) (near Glattfelden)
      - Ustermer Aa - 10.9 km (6.8 mi) - 62.75 km^{2} (24.23 sq mi) (into Greifensee at Niederuster)
    - Töss - 58 km (36 mi) - 442 km^{2} (171 sq mi) (in Teufen)
    - Thur - 125 km (78 mi) - 1,724 km^{2} (666 sq mi) (near Flaach)
      - Murg - 34 km (21 mi) - 213.45 km^{2} (82.41 sq mi) (near Warth-Weiningen)
      - Sitter - 48.91 km (30.39 mi) - 340 km^{2} (130 sq mi) (in Bischofszell)
        - Urnäsch - 23.5 km (14.6 mi) - 93.6 km^{2} (36.1 sq mi) (in near St Gallen Haggen)
    - Durach - 15.2 km (9.4 mi) - 62.9 km^{2} (24.3 sq mi) (in Schaffhausen)
    - Biber - 30.7 km (19.1 mi) - 168 km^{2} (65 sq mi) (near Hemishofen)
  - Lake Constance (Obersee, Seerhein, Untersee)
    - Aach - 1.7 km (1.1 mi) - 33.2 km^{2} (12.8 sq mi) (in Arbon)
  - Alpine Rhine (Alter Rhein, Rheintaler Binnenkanal) - 93.5 km (58.1 mi) - 6,119 km^{2} (2,363 sq mi)
    - Saar - 10.7 km (6.6 mi) - 24.2 km^{2} (9.3 sq mi) (in Trübbach)
    - Tamina - 30 km (19 mi) - 155.48 km^{2} (60.03 sq mi) (in Bad Ragaz)
    - Landquart - 43 km (27 mi) - 618 km^{2} (239 sq mi) (in Landquart)
    - Plessur - 33 km (21 mi) - 267 km^{2} (103 sq mi) (in Chur)
      - Rabiosa - 7.9 km (4.9 mi) - 52.6 km^{2} (20.3 sq mi) (near Meiersboden)
    - Hinterrhein - 57.3 km (35.6 mi) - 1,693 km^{2} (654 sq mi) (at Reichenau)
      - Albula - 36 km (22 mi) - 950 km^{2} (370 sq mi) (near Thusis)
        - Gelgia (in Tiefencastel)
        - Landwasser - 30.5 km (19.0 mi) - 293.11 km (182.13 mi) - 950 km^{2} (370 sq mi) (near Filisur)
          - Dischmabach - 16 km (9.9 mi) - 53.7 km^{2} (20.7 sq mi) (near Davos)
      - Avers Rhine - 20 km (12 mi) - 261 km^{2} (101 sq mi) (near Andeer)
    - Vorderrhein - 67.5 km (41.9 mi) - 1,514 km^{2} (585 sq mi) (at Reichenau)
      - Rabiusa - 32 km (20 mi)
      - Valser Rhine - 30 km (19 mi) - 186 km^{2} (72 sq mi)
      - Rein da Curnera - 7 km (4.3 mi) - 27 km^{2} (10 sq mi)
        - Rein da Maighels - 5.4 km (3.4 mi) - 9.07 km^{2} (3.50 sq mi)
      - Rein da Medel - 25 km (16 mi) - 128 km^{2} (49 sq mi)
      - Rein da Tuma - 3.5 km (2.2 mi) - 5.6 km^{2} (2.2 sq mi)
        - (see sources of the Rhine)
- **Rhône** - 264 km (164 mi) - 10,403 km^{2} (4,017 sq mi) (in Port-Saint-Louis-du-Rhône, France)
  - Saône (in Lyon, France)
    - Doubs - 74 km (46 mi) - 1,310 km^{2} (510 sq mi) (in Verdun-sur-le-Doubs, France)
      - Allaine - 28 km (17 mi) - 197 km^{2} (76 sq mi) (near Montbéliard, France)
  - Allondon - 17.9 km (11.1 mi) - 148 km^{2} (57 sq mi) (in Russin)
  - Arve - 108 km (67 mi) - 1,976 km^{2} (763 sq mi) (in Geneva)
  - Versoix - 21.8 km (13.5 mi) - 90.7 km^{2} (35.0 sq mi) (into Lake Geneva in Versoix)
  - Hermance - 14 km (8.7 mi) - 42.5 km^{2} (16.4 sq mi) (into Lake Geneva in Hermance)
  - Aubonne - 12.2 km (7.6 mi) - 96.3 km^{2} (37.2 sq mi) (into Lake Geneva near Aubonne)
  - Venoge - 38 km (24 mi) - 238 km^{2} (92 sq mi) (into Lake Geneva in Saint-Sulpice)
    - Veyron - 23.5 km (14.6 mi) - 81.84 km^{2} (31.60 sq mi) (near La Sarraz)
  - Trient - 17 km (11 mi) - 164.2 km^{2} (63.4 sq mi) (near Vernayaz)
  - Drance - 43 km (27 mi) - 678 km^{2} (262 sq mi) (in Martigny)
  - Sionne - 11 km (6.8 mi) - 27.64 km^{2} (10.67 sq mi) (in Sion)
  - Navizence - 27.9 km (17.3 mi) - 255.54 km^{2} (98.66 sq mi) (in Chippis)
  - Lonza (in Gampel)
  - Vispa - 40 km (25 mi) - 787 km^{2} (304 sq mi) (in Visp)
  - Massa - 7 km (4.3 mi) - 202.63 km^{2} (78.24 sq mi) (near Bitsch)
- **Po** (near Venice, Italy)
  - Adda (in Cremona, Italy)
    - Breggia (into Lake Como, between Cernobbio and Como, Italy)
    - Mera (into Lake Como in Sorico, Italy)
    - Poschiavino (in Tirano, Italy)
  - Ticino - 91 km (57 mi) - 1,616 km^{2} (624 sq mi) (in Pavia, Italy)
    - Toce (into Lake Maggiore in Verbania, Italy)
      - Diveria (near Domodossola, Italy)
    - Tresa - 13 km (8.1 mi) - 754 km^{2} (291 sq mi) (into Lake Maggiore in Luino, Italy)
      - Vedeggio - 29 km (18 mi) - 100.22 km^{2} (38.70 sq mi) (into Lake Lugano in Agno)
      - Mara - 9.4 km (5.8 mi) - 14.62 km^{2} (5.64 sq mi) (into Lake Lugano in Maroggia)
      - Cassarate - 17 km (11 mi) - 76.17 km^{2} (29.41 sq mi) (into Lake Lugano in Lugano)
    - Giona - 15.1 km (9.4 mi) - 47.52 km^{2} (18.35 sq mi) (into Lake Maggiore in Maccagno, Italy)
    - Maggia - 55 km (34 mi) - 926 km^{2} (358 sq mi) (into Lake Maggiore in Locarno)
      - Melezzo Orientale - 42 km (26 mi) - 328.04 km^{2} (126.66 sq mi) (near Ponte Brolla)
        - Isorno - 23.9 km (14.9 mi) - 146.7 km^{2} (56.6 sq mi) (near Intragna)
    - Verzasca - 34 km (21 mi) - 235.4 km^{2} (90.9 sq mi) (into Lake Maggiore in Tenero-Contra)
    - Moesa - 46 km (29 mi) - 47,487 km^{2} (18,335 sq mi) (in Arbedo-Castione)
    - Brenno - 36 km (22 mi) - 407.47 km^{2} (157.33 sq mi) (between Pollegio/Biasca)
- **Adige** (near Venice, Italy)
  - Rom - 24.7 km (15.3 mi) - 186 km^{2} (72 sq mi) (in Glurns, Italy)
- **Danube** (in Sulina, Romania)
  - Inn - 104 km (65 mi) - 2,150 km^{2} (830 sq mi) (in Passau, Germany)
    - Spöl - 42 km (26 mi) - 433.64 km^{2} (167.43 sq mi) (near Zernez)
    - Flaz - 6.5 km (4.0 mi) - 193.13 km^{2} (74.57 sq mi) (near Samedan)

== Border rivers ==
=== International ===
- Allondon, forming a short stretch of the border with France (ca. 2.5 km (1.6 mi))
- Alpine Rhine (and Alter Rhein), forming most of the border with Liechtenstein and part of the border with Austria
- Hermance, forming part of the border with France
- High Rhine (and Lake Constance), forming mostly the border with Germany
- La Morge, forming part of the border with France
- Le Doubs, forming part of the border with France (for about 40 km (25 mi))
- Rhône, forms part of the border with France west of Geneva
- Tresa, follows part of the border with Italy
- Wutach, forming about 6 km (3.7 mi) of the border with Germany

=== Between cantons ===
- Aare, part of the boundary between the canton of Solothurn with the cantons of Aargau and Bern
- Alpine Rhine canal, part of the border between the cantons of St. Gallen and Grisons (Graubünden)
- Biber, part of the boundary between the cantons of Zug and Schwyz
- Birs, short sections of the boundary between the cantons of Basel-Landschaft and Solothurn
- Engelberger Aa, parts of the boundary between the cantons of Nidwalden and Obwalden
- High Rhine, most of the boundary between the canton of Schaffhausen with the cantons of Zurich and Thurgau
- Jona, short section of the boundary between the cantons of St. Gallen and Zurich
- Linth canal, part of the border between the canton of St. Gallen with the cantons of Glarus and Schwyz
- Reuss, boundary between the cantons of Aargau and Zug, part of the boundary between the cantons of Aargau and Zurich
- Sitter, part of the boundary between the cantons of Appenzell Ausserrhoden and Appenzell Innerrhoden
- Thielle canal (Zihlkanal), border between the cantons of Bern and Neuchâtel
- Thur, short section of the border between the cantons of Thurgau and Zurich

== Alphabetical list ==
=== A–E ===
- Aach
- Aare (Aar)
- Albula
- Allaine
- Allondon
- Alp
- Alpine Rhine
- Arve
- Aubonne
- Avers Rhine
- Biber (Alp)
- Biber (Rhine)
- Birs
- Birsig
- Breggia
- Brenno
- Broye
- Cassarate
- Dischmabach
- Diveria
- Doubs
- Drance
- Durach
- Emme
- Engelberger Aa
- Ergolz

=== F–K ===
- Flaz
- Gelgia
- Giona
- Glâne
- Glatt
- Hallwiler Aa
- Hermance
- High Rhine
- Hinterrhein (Posterior Rhine)
- Ilfis
- Inn
- Isorno
- Jona
- Kander
- Kleine Emme
- Klingengraben
- Kübach
- Küsnachter Dorfbach

=== L–O ===
- Landquart
- Landwasser
- Limmat
- Linth
- Littenbach
- Lonza
- Lorze
- Lütschine
- Lützel
- Maggia
- Mara
- Massa
- Melezzo Orientale
- Mera
- Minster
- Moesa
- Möhlinbach
- Muota
- Murg
- Navizence
- Orbe

=== P–S ===
- Plessur
- Poschiavino
- Rabiosa
- Rabiusa
- Raus
- Reppisch
- Rein da Curnera
- Rein da Maighels
- Rein da Medel
- Rein da Tuma
- Reuss
- Rhine
- Rhône
- Rom
- Saane/Sarine
- Saar
- Sarner Aa
- Schächen
- Schwarzbach
- Seerenbach
- Seerhein
- Seez
- Sense
- Sernf
- Sihl
- Simme
- Sionne
- Sissle
- Sitter
- Sorne
- Spöl
- Suhre (Sure)
- Surb
- Suze

=== T–Z ===
- Tamina
- Thielle
- Thur
- Ticino
- Töss
- Tresa
- Trient
- Upper Rhine
- Urnäsch
- Urtene
- Ustermer Aa
- Valser Rhine
- Vedeggio
- Venoge
- Versoix
- Verzasca
- Veyron
- Vispa
- Vorderrhein (Anterior Rhine)
- Waag
- Wägitaler Aa
- Wiese
- Wigger
- Wüeribach
- Wutach
- Wyna
- Zihl

== See also ==
- Hydrology of Switzerland
- Geography of Switzerland
  - List of islands of Switzerland
  - List of lakes of Switzerland
  - List of waterfalls in Switzerland
- Rivers of Europe
- Valleys of the Alps
