= Piz Alpetta (Lepontine Alps) =

Mountain in Switzerland

- Location within Switzerland

Highest point
- Elevation: 2,845 m (9,334 ft)
- Prominence: 70 m (230 ft)
- Parent peak: Piz Ravetsch
- Coordinates: 46°36′9.4″N 8°42′13″E

Geography
- Location: Graubünden, Switzerland
- Parent range: Lepontine Alps

Piz Alpetta is a mountain of the Swiss Lepontine Alps, located south of Tschamut in the canton of Graubünden. It lies north of Piz Ravetsch, on the range between the Val Maighels and the Val Curnera.
