= Rein da Maighels =

River in Switzerland

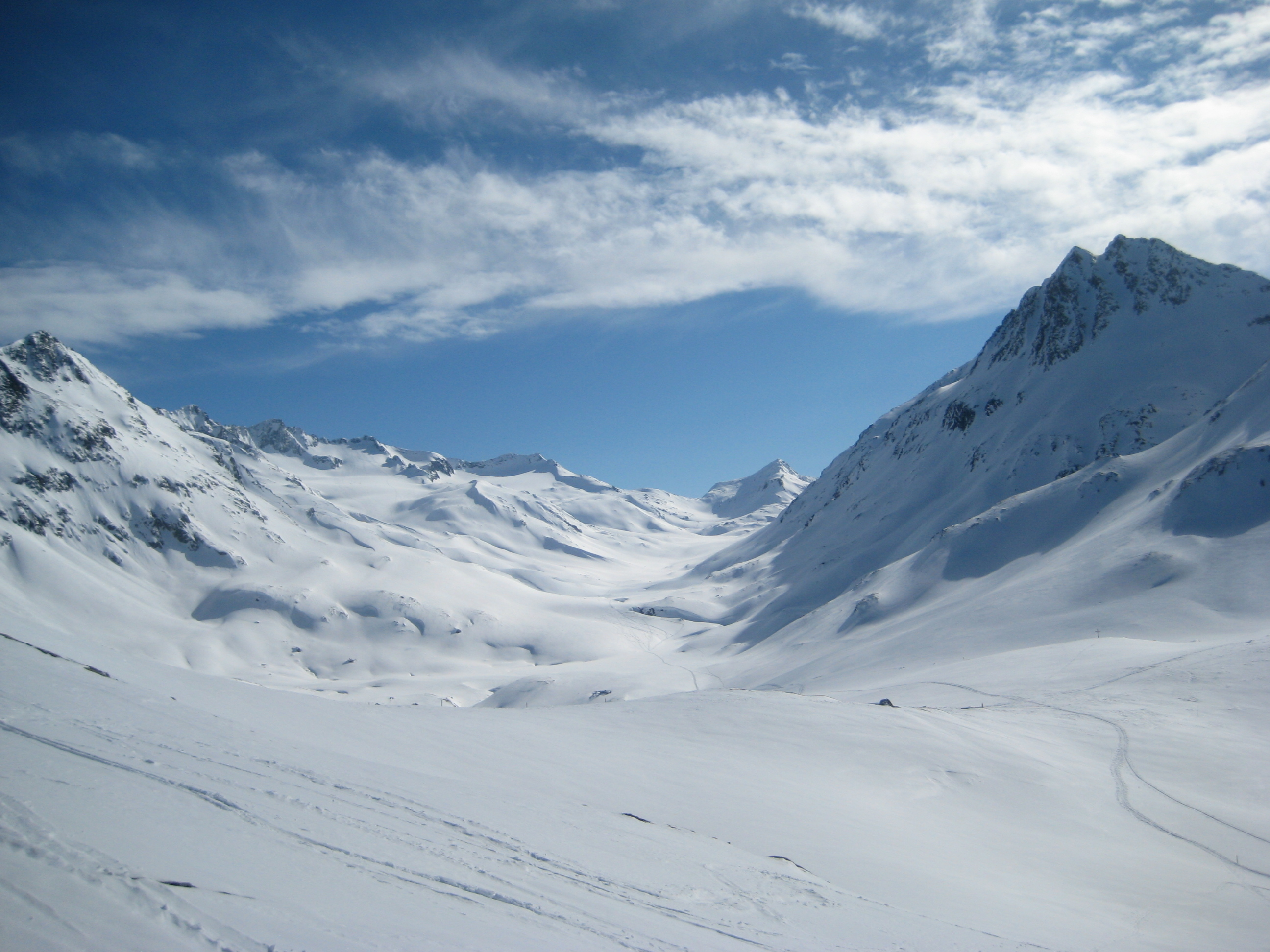
- The Maighels with the headwaters of the river in winter

Location
- Country: Switzerland
- Region: Tujetsch, Graubünden

Physical characteristics
- Source
  - location: Maighels Glacier
  - coordinates: 46°35′14.5″N 8°41′32.9″E
  - elevation: 2,590 m (8,500 ft)
- Mouth
  - location: Into the Lai da Curnera
  - coordinates: 46°37′34″N 8°42′29″E
  - elevation: 1,950 m (6,400 ft)

Basin features
- Progression: Rein da Curnera→ Vorderrhein→ Rhine→ North Sea

The Rein da Maighels (German: Maighelserrhein) is one of the main tributaries of the Rhine (see Sources of the Rhine) and is a tributary to the Rein da Curnera. The firm Kraftwerke Vorderrhein AG has built a hydropower dam creating a reservoir, called the Lai da Curnera, into which both rivers now flow.

The origin of the Rein da Maighels is the Maghels Glacier (Romansh: Glatscher da Maighels) on the Piz Ravetsch near the point where the cantons of Graubünden, Ticino and Uri meet. From the glacier, the Rein da Maighels flows north, through the Val da Maighels, then east, through Val Platta' between Piz Cavradi and Piz Piogn Crap, then into Val Curnera and into the Lai da Curnera reservoir.

== Description ==
The two rivers are dammed at that point by the Lai da Curnera; the power plant facilities belong to the Vorderrhein power plants. The Rein da Maighels originates at Piz Ravetsch from the Maighels Glacier (Roaminish: Glatscher da Maighels ) near the border of Graubünden with the cantons of Ticino and Uri. It initially flows north through the Val Maighels , before turning east through the Val Platta, a narrow passage between Piz Cavradi and Piz Piogn Crap, into the Val Curnera . Its original length was 4.5 kilometers.

It is assumed that the stream did not previously flow into the Val Curnera, but continued straight north, where the Rein da Tuma drains the valley.
