= Hermance (river) =

River in France and Switzerland

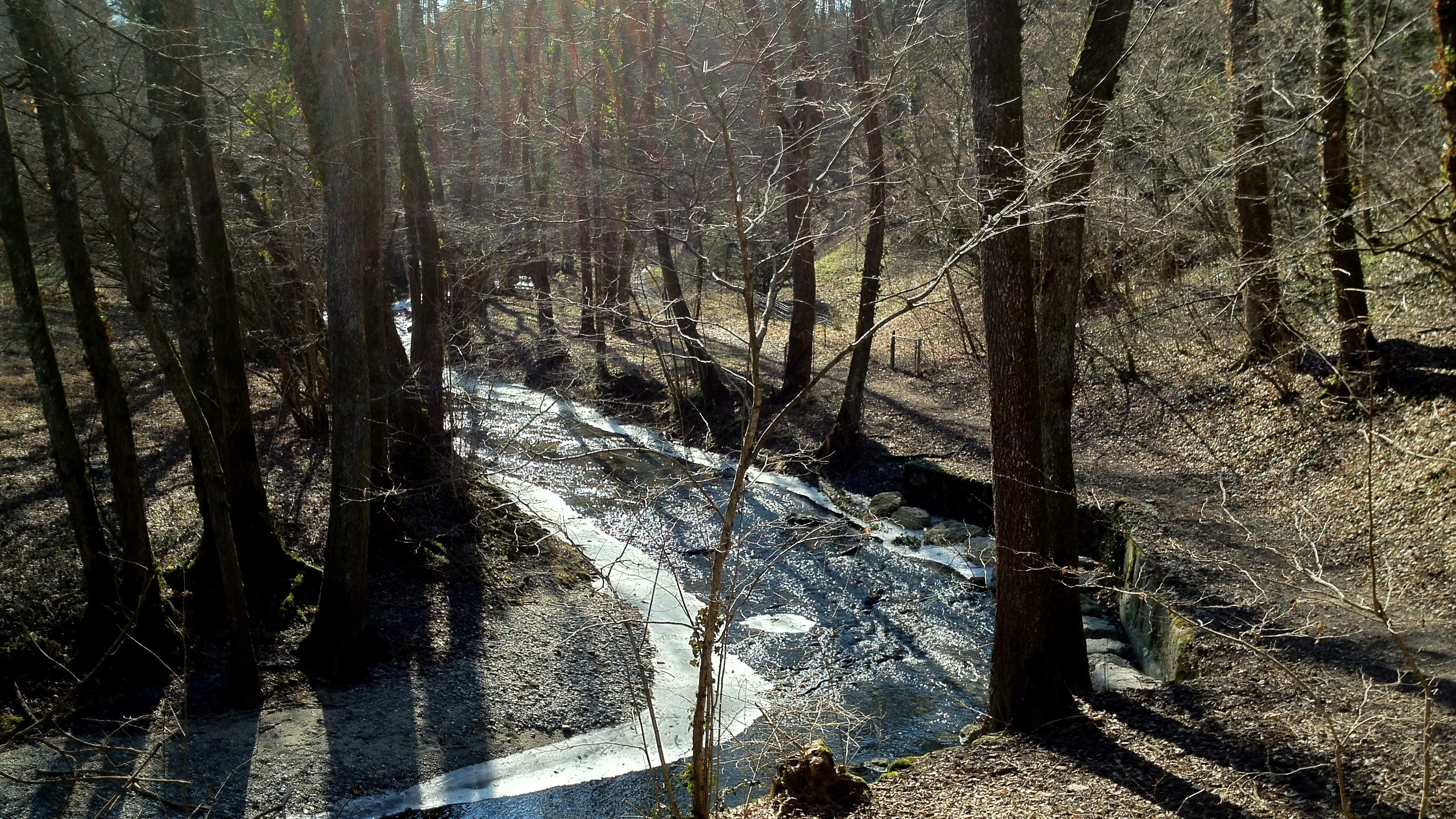

- Location within France Location within Auvergne-Rhône-Alpes

Location
- Country: France
- Department: Haute-Savoie
- Country: Switzerland
- Canton: Geneva

Physical characteristics
- Source
  - elevation: 563 m (1,847 ft)
- Mouth: Lake Geneva
  - coordinates: 46.3042°N 6.2417°E
  - elevation: 372 m (1,220 ft)
- Length: 14 km (8.7 mi)
- Basin size: 42.5 km^{2} (16.4 sq mi)

Basin features
- Progression: Lake Geneva→ Rhône→ Mediterranean Sea

The Hermance (French pronunciation: [ɛʁmɑ̃s]) is a river in France and Switzerland, that discharges into Lake Geneva. It rises near Loisin in Haute-Savoie, France, at 563 m (1,847 ft) elevation. In its lower half, downstream from Veigy, it marks the Swiss-French border. It flows into Lake Geneva between the villages Hermance (Switzerland) and Chens-sur-Léman (France), at 372 m (1,220 ft) elevation. Its total length is 14 km (8.7 mi) (13 km (8.1 mi) according to the Sandre database), of which 6.5 kilometres on the border. Its catchment area is 42.5 km^{2} (16.4 sq mi), of which 37 km^{2} in France.

Flood control and other river maintenance issues are regulated under the 1959 Hermance River Agreement.

== See also ==
- List of rivers in France
- List of rivers in Switzerland
