= Lützel (river) =

River in Switzerland

Lützel / Lucelle
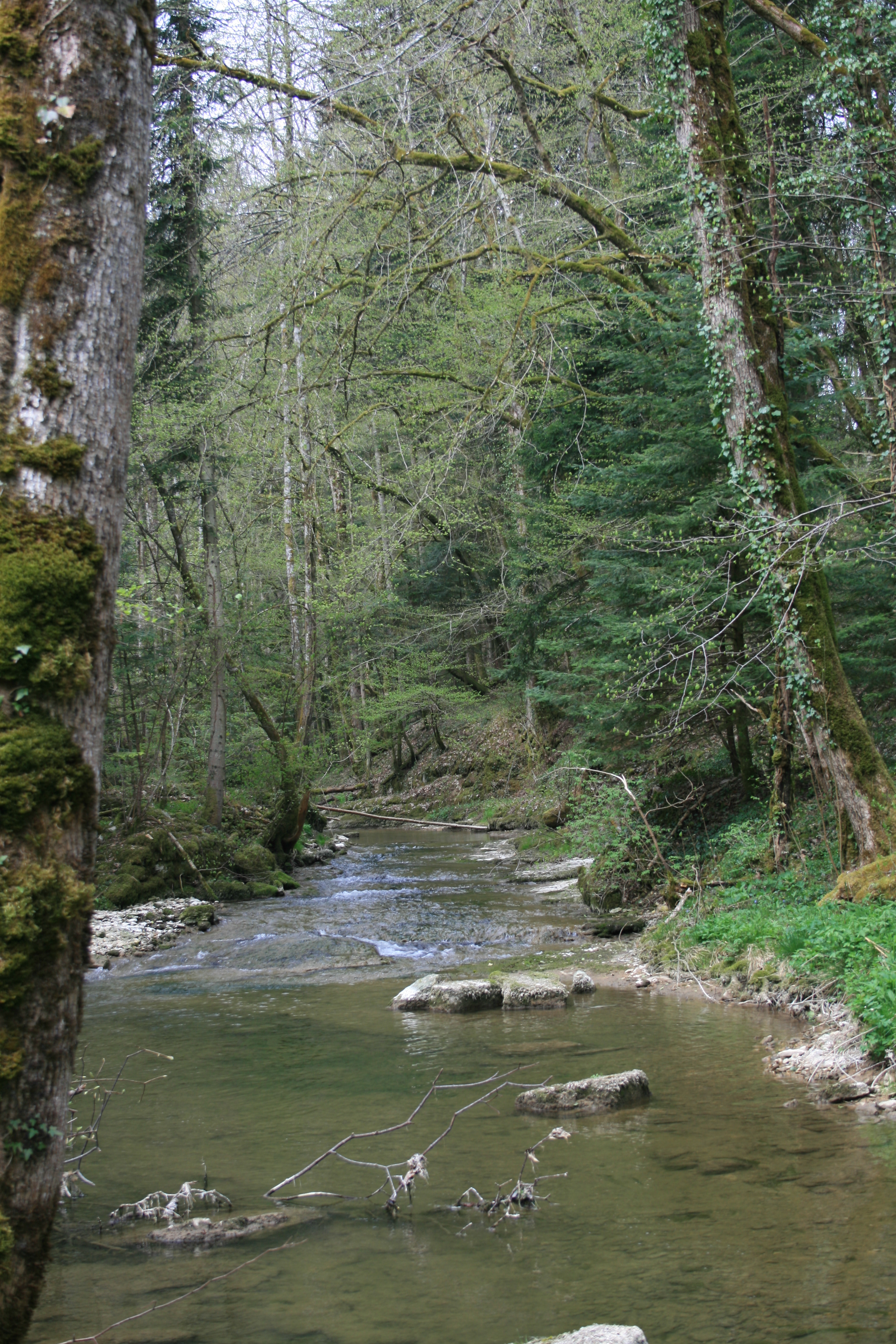
- The Lützel near Lucelle

- Location within Switzerland

Location
- Countries: Switzerland; France
- Reference no.: FR: "A0080300" (in French). Sandre., CH: 503

Physical characteristics
- Source
  - location: South of the hamlet of Le Moulin in the municipality of Bourrignon, Switzerland
  - coordinates: 47°23′04″N 7°15′47″E
  - elevation: ca. 828 m (2,717 ft)
- Mouth
  - location: between Laufen and Liesberg (Switzerland) into the Birs
  - coordinates: 47°24′39″N 7°29′40″E
  - elevation: 354 m (1,161 ft)
- Length: 25.4 km (15.8 mi)

Basin features
- Progression: Birs→ Rhine→ North Sea

The Lützel (French: Lucelle) is a tributary of the Birs in Switzerland and France. It flows into the Birs near Laufen. For 12 km, it forms the border between Switzerland and France.

== Tributaries ==
- Ruisseau de Bavelier (right)
- Bösenbach (right)

== See also ==
- List of rivers of Switzerland
