= Raus (Birs) =

River in Switzerland

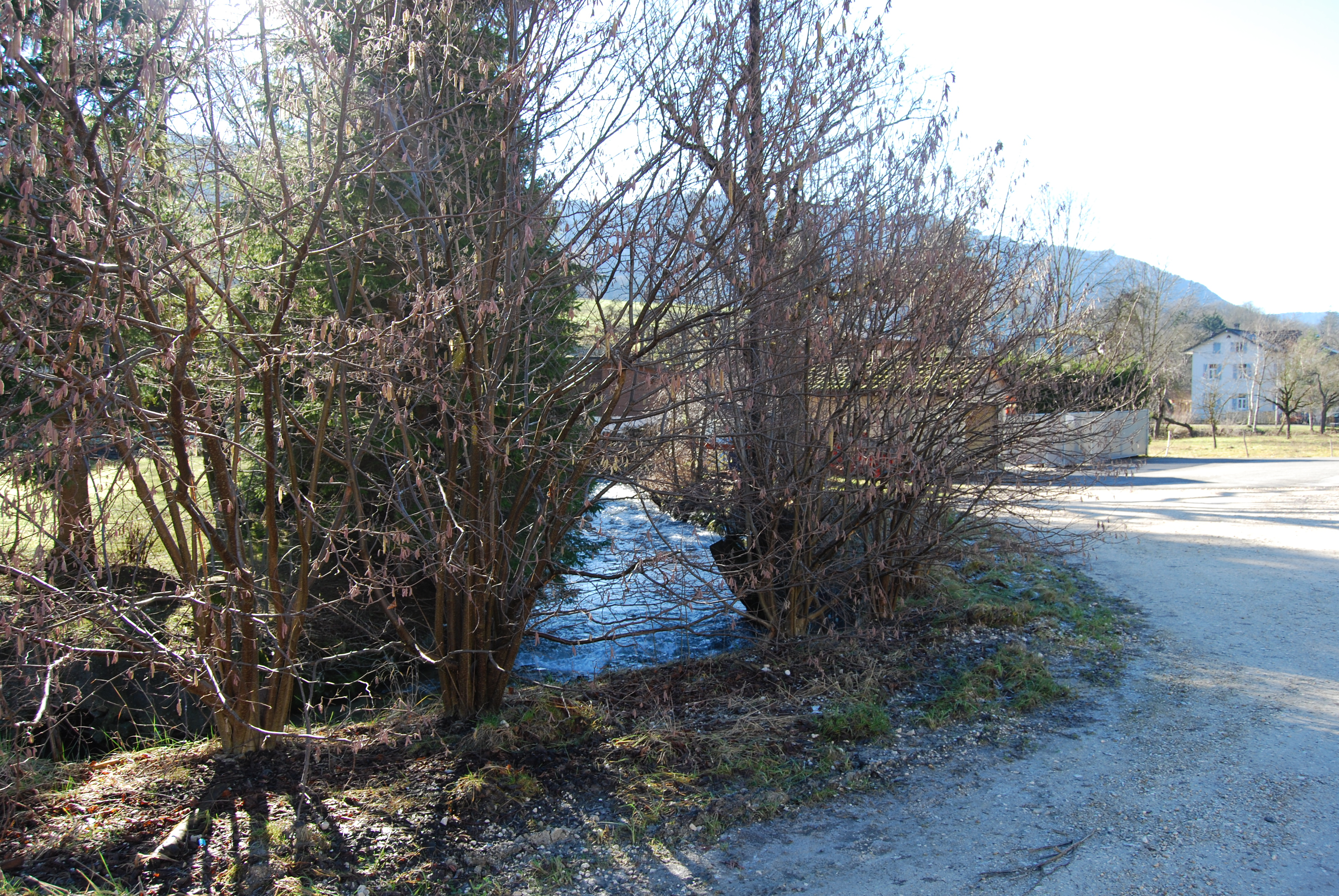

Location
- Location: Switzerland, Jura, Klus near Moutier
- Reference no.: CH: 925

Physical characteristics
- Source
  - location: northwestern spur of the Gänsbrunnen in Canton Solothurn
  - elevation: 775 m above the sea
- Mouth
  - location: Birs (Fr.: La Birse) near Moutier
  - coordinates: 47°16′55″N 7°22′56″E
  - elevation: 527 m above the sea
- Length: 9.7 km

Basin features
- Progression: Birs→ Rhine→ North Sea
- Landmarks: Large towns: Moutier; Villages: Crémines, Grandval, Eschert

The Raus is a 9.7-kilometre-long (6.0 mi) tributary of the Birs in the Klus of Moutier.

== Course ==
The Raus rises at a spring at a height of 775 metres (2,543 ft) roughly northwest of Gänsbrunnen in the Swiss canton of Solothurn.

The Grand Rue runs along the Raus, the road between Moutier and Balsthal, whose branch near Gänsbrunnen leads to the Weissenstein Pass.

After 9.7 kilometres the Raus empties into the Birs near Moutier at an elevation of 527 metres (1,729 ft) above sea level.

== Catchment area ==
The Raus flows through two Swiss cantons, Berne and Solothurn, and rises on the language boundary.

== See also ==
- List of rivers of Switzerland
