= Versoix (river) =

River in eastern France and Switzerland

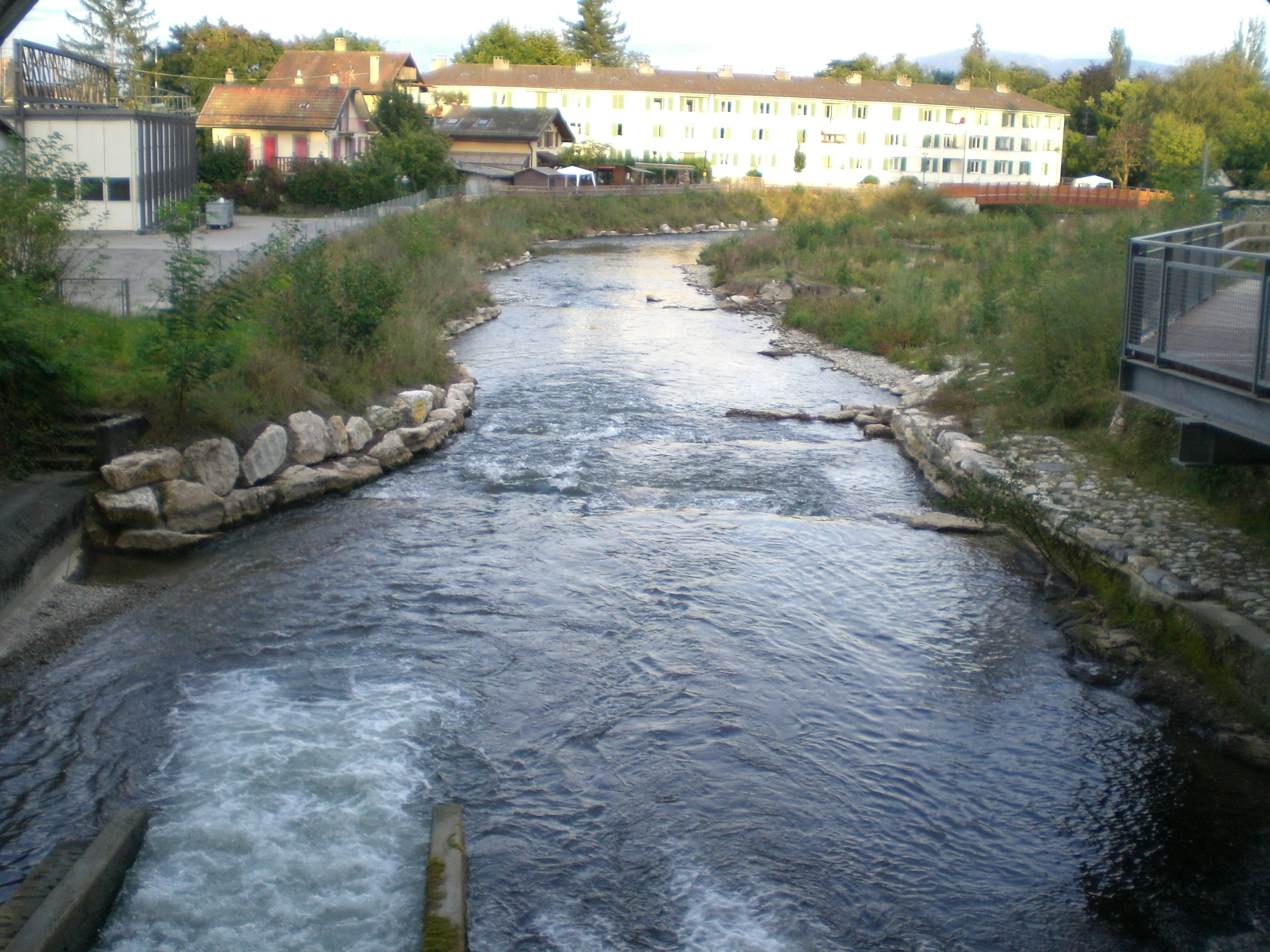
- The Versoix, flowing through Versoix

- Location within France Location within Auvergne-Rhône-Alpes

Location
- Country: France, Switzerland

Physical characteristics
- Source
  - location: Jura Mountains of Ain (France)
  - elevation: 600 m (2,000 ft)
- Mouth: Lake Geneva
  - location: Versoix (Switzerland)
  - coordinates: 46.2749°N 6.1703°E
  - elevation: 372 m (1,220 ft)
- Length: 21.8 km (13.5 mi)
- Basin size: 90.7 km^{2} (35.0 sq mi)
- Discharge
  - average: 3.2 m^{3}/s (110 cu ft/s)

Basin features
- Progression: Lake Geneva→ Rhône→ Mediterranean Sea

The Versoix (French pronunciation: [vɛʁswa]) is a river in France and in Switzerland. It is a 21.8 kilometres (13.5 mi) tributary of Lake Geneva (French: Lac Léman). Its catchment area is 90.7 km^{2} (35.0 sq mi), of which 72.6 km^{2} in France.

The river begins in the Jura Mountains in Ain, France as Rivière la Divonne. It flows eastward through Divonne-les-Bains and Lac de Divonne approaching the Canton of Vaud. From there it turns southward toward form 10.5 kilometres (6.5 mi) of the France–Switzerland border, entering the Canton of Geneva and continuing eastward toward Versoix where it enters the lake.

== See also ==
- List of rivers of Switzerland
