= Emme (river) =

River in Switzerland

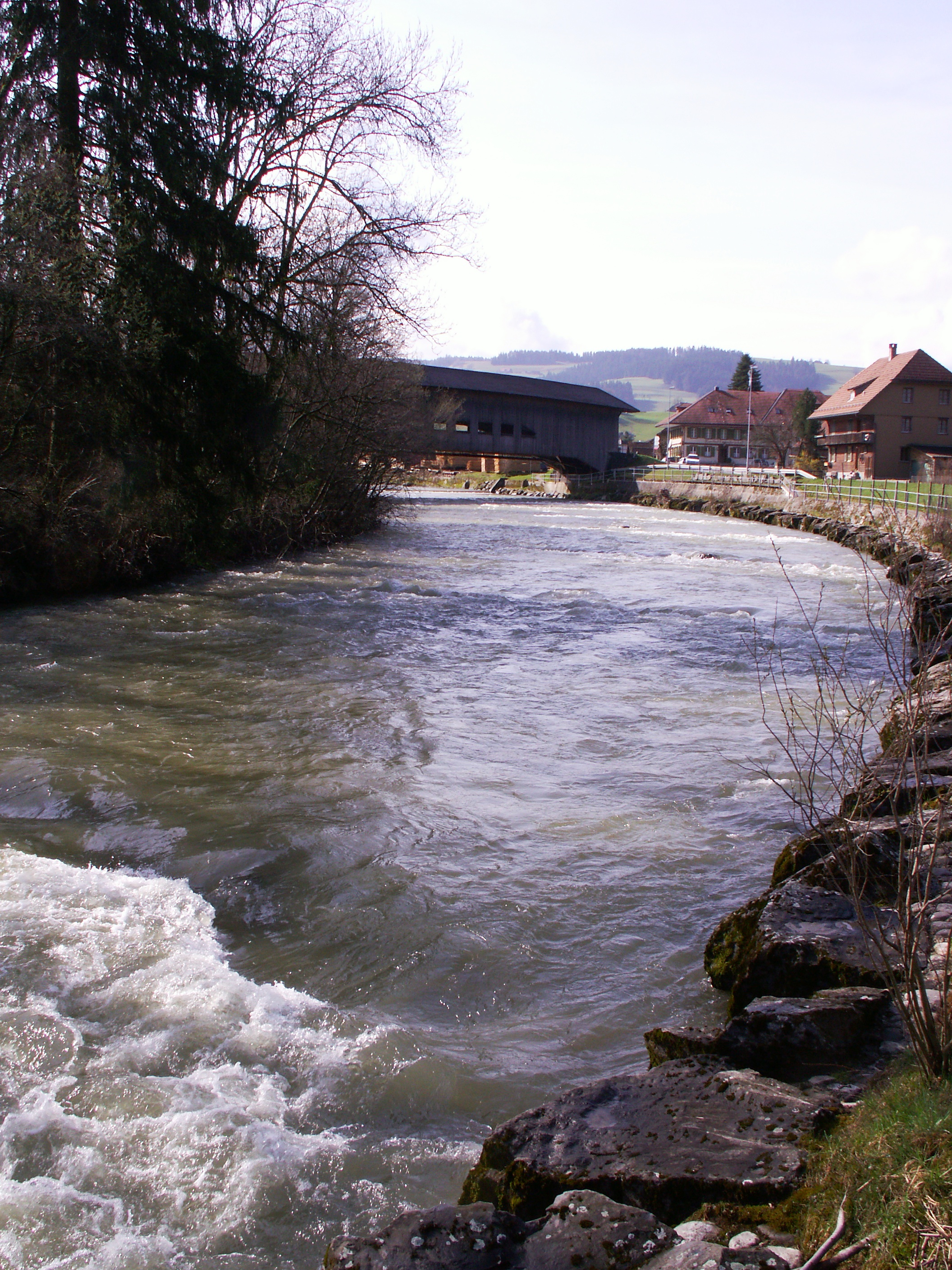
- The Emme near Schüpbach

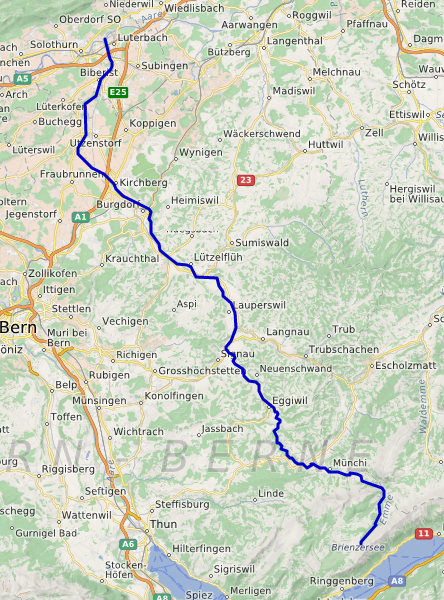

Location
- Country: Switzerland

Physical characteristics
- Mouth: Aare
  - coordinates: 47.2186°N 7.5713°E

Basin features
- Progression: Aare→ Rhine→ North Sea

The Emme (German pronunciation: [ˈɛmə]), also known as the Grosse Emme, is a river in Switzerland. It rises in the Alps between the peaks of Hohgant and Augstmatthorn in the canton of Bern. The Emme is 80 kilometres (50 miles) long and flows through the Emmental and between Zuchwil and Luterbach into the Aare. The drainage area is 983 km^{2} (380 sq mi). The average discharge at the mouth is approximately 20,000 litres per second (5,300 US gallons per second). The maximum discharge can be up to 500,000 L/s (130,000 USgal/s).

The Emme is known for its sudden variations in water discharge. The narration Die Wassernot im Emmental (The Water Crisis in the Emmen Valley) by Jeremias Gotthelf describes a very large and destructive, and therefore well-known, flood which occurred August 13, 1837. This and other floods led to the building of numerous canals and dams in the 19th century.

The tributaries of the Emme are the Ilfis and the Limpach.

== See also ==
- Emmental
- Kleine Emme
- List of rivers of Switzerland
