= Ilfis =

River in Switzerland

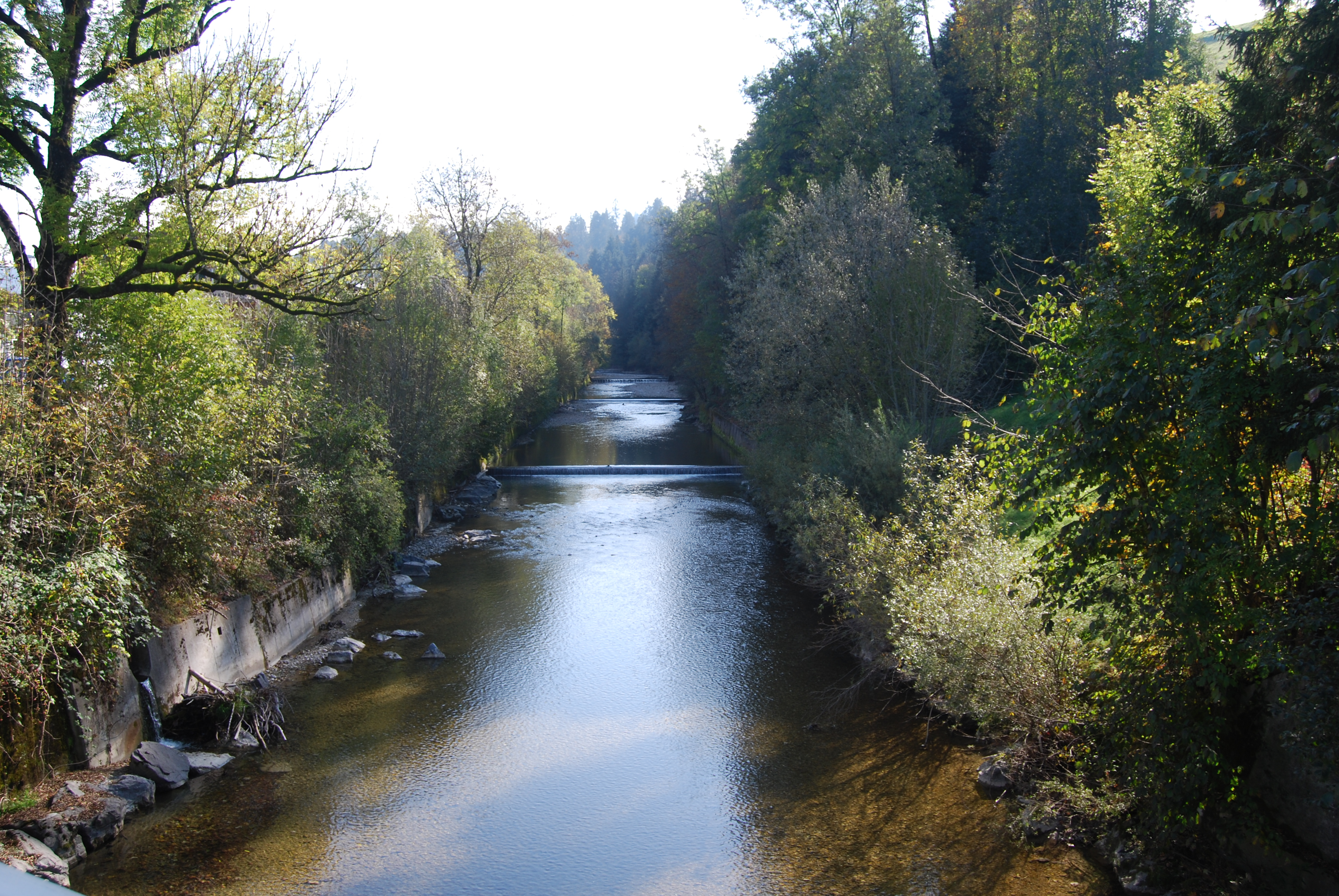
- Ilfis in Langnau im Emmental, canton of Bern, Switzerland

Location
- Country: Switzerland

Physical characteristics
- Source
  - location: Schrattenfluh
  - coordinates: 46.839°N 7.956°E
  - elevation: 1,600 m (5,200 ft)
- Mouth
  - location: Emme (Langnau im Emmental/Lauperswil)
  - coordinates: 46.9506°N 7.7504°E
  - elevation: 645 m (2,116 ft)
- Length: 21.5 km (13.4 mi)
- Basin size: 188 km^{2} (73 sq mi)

Basin features
- Progression: Emme→ Aare→ Rhine→ North Sea
- Tributaries
  - left: Schonbach, Wittenmossgraben, Schärligbach, Steinbach, Chrümpelgraben, Ortbach, Teufenbachgraben, Ramserengraben, Mülebach
  - right: Hilfernbach, Staldegrabe, Rämisbach, Eschlissbach, Türrenbachgrabe, Hämelbach, Trubbach, Gohl, Frittenbach

The Ilfis (in the local dialect: [(d̥) ˈʏu̯fiz̥/ˈɪu̯fiz̥]) is a Swiss river in the cantons of Bern and Lucerne. It runs through the Entlebuch and upper Emmental regions before joining the Emme.

== Name ==
The earliest evidence of the name Ilfis comes from the year 1337 where it might refer to either the village of Ilfis, now part of Langnau im Emmental, or the farms at Enedilfis, in the municipality of Escholzmatt. It first appears as a river in a document from 1371, though only a copy from 1531 still exists.

The origin of the name is not fully clear. It could be a derivation of *Elvis(i)ā which comes from the Gallic color root word * elvo-, meaning brown or yellow and refer to the yellowish tint of the water. It may also come from or be the origin of the name Hilfern which is often associated with the river.

== See also ==
- List of rivers of Switzerland
