= Aach (Arbon) =

River in Switzerland

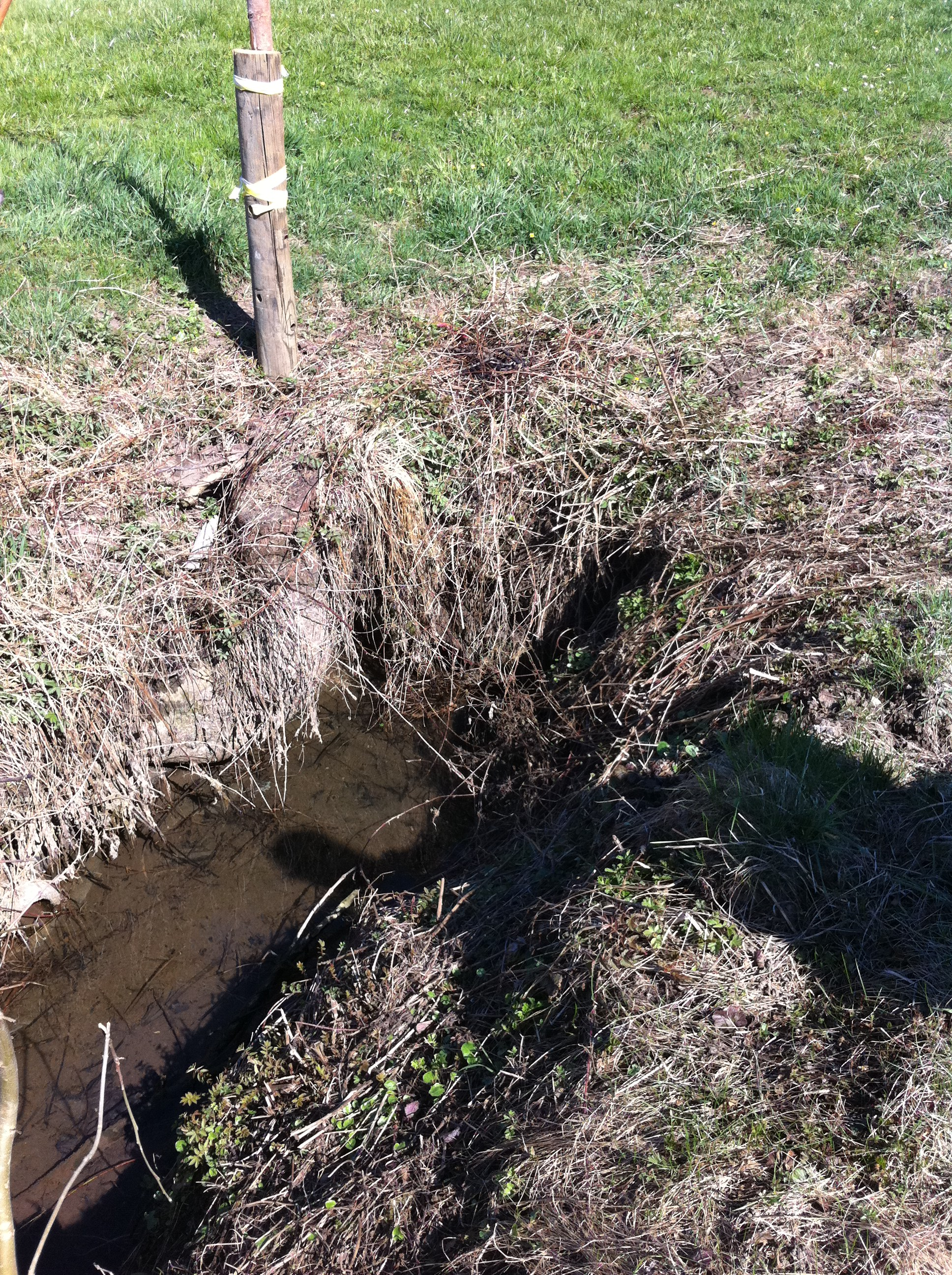

Location
- Country: Switzerland

Physical characteristics
- Mouth: Lake Constance
  - coordinates: 47.5066°N 9.4358°E

Basin features
- Progression: Lake Constance→ Rhine→ North Sea

The Aach is a river in Arbon in Switzerland, formed by the confluence of two rivers, the Hegibach and the Feilebach, each about 9 kilometres (6 mi) long. It flows through the town of Arbon and after almost two kilometers flows into Lake Constance on the south of Arbon next to Steinach, shortly after it catches the Salbach.

The link road Arbon-Landquart crosses the Aach. Built in 1910, the bridge over the river was completely renovated for the first time in April 2006, after more than 90 years.

== See also ==
- List of rivers of Switzerland
