= Kübach River =

River in Switzerland

Kübach Schlifibach
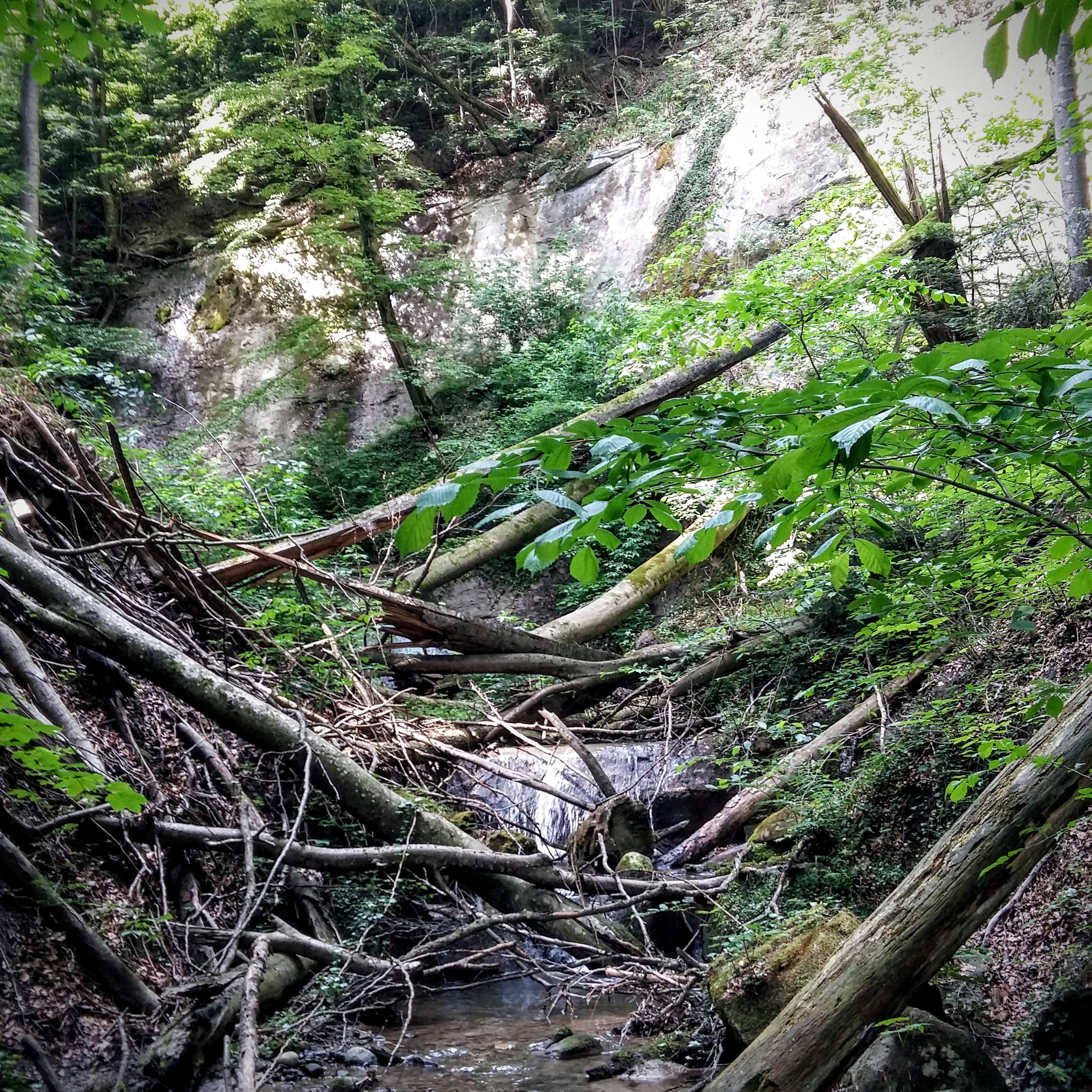
- The Kübachtobel near the Schlifi in Berneck is also called Schlifitobel.

Location
- Country: Switzerland
- Cantons: Appenzell Ausserrhoden; Appenzell Innerrhoden; St. Gallen
- Towns: Oberegg District; Berneck

Physical characteristics
- Mouth: Littenbach
  - coordinates: 47°25′48″N 9°37′34″E

The Kübach, also known as the Schlifibach, is a river in the Alpine Rhine in Switzerland. It releases its waters in the foothills of the Appenzell Alps, feeding into the Littenbach river.
