= Mara (torrent) =

River in Italy and Switzerland

Location
- Country: Switzerland, Italy

Physical characteristics
- Source
  - location: Monte Sighignola (Alta Valle Intelvi)
  - elevation: 1,200 m (3,900 ft)
- Mouth: Lago di Lugano
  - location: Maroggia (CH)
  - coordinates: 45.9333°N 8.9681°E
- Length: 8 km (5.0 mi)

Basin features
- Progression: Lake Lugano→ Tresa→ Lake Maggiore→ Ticino→ Po→ Adriatic Sea

The Mara is an 8-kilometre (5 mi) Italian stream (or torrente) of Insubria, which runs through the Italian Province of Como and the Swiss Canton Ticino. It rises on the slopes of Monte Sighignola and enters Lake Lugano at Maroggia.

Despite the small size of its drainage basin the river is able to provide a source of hydro-electricity through a power station belonging to the Aziende industriali di Lugano.

The Mara's water level is liable to rapid and unpredictable augmentation following sudden storms.
