= Piz Ravetsch =

Mountain in Switzerland

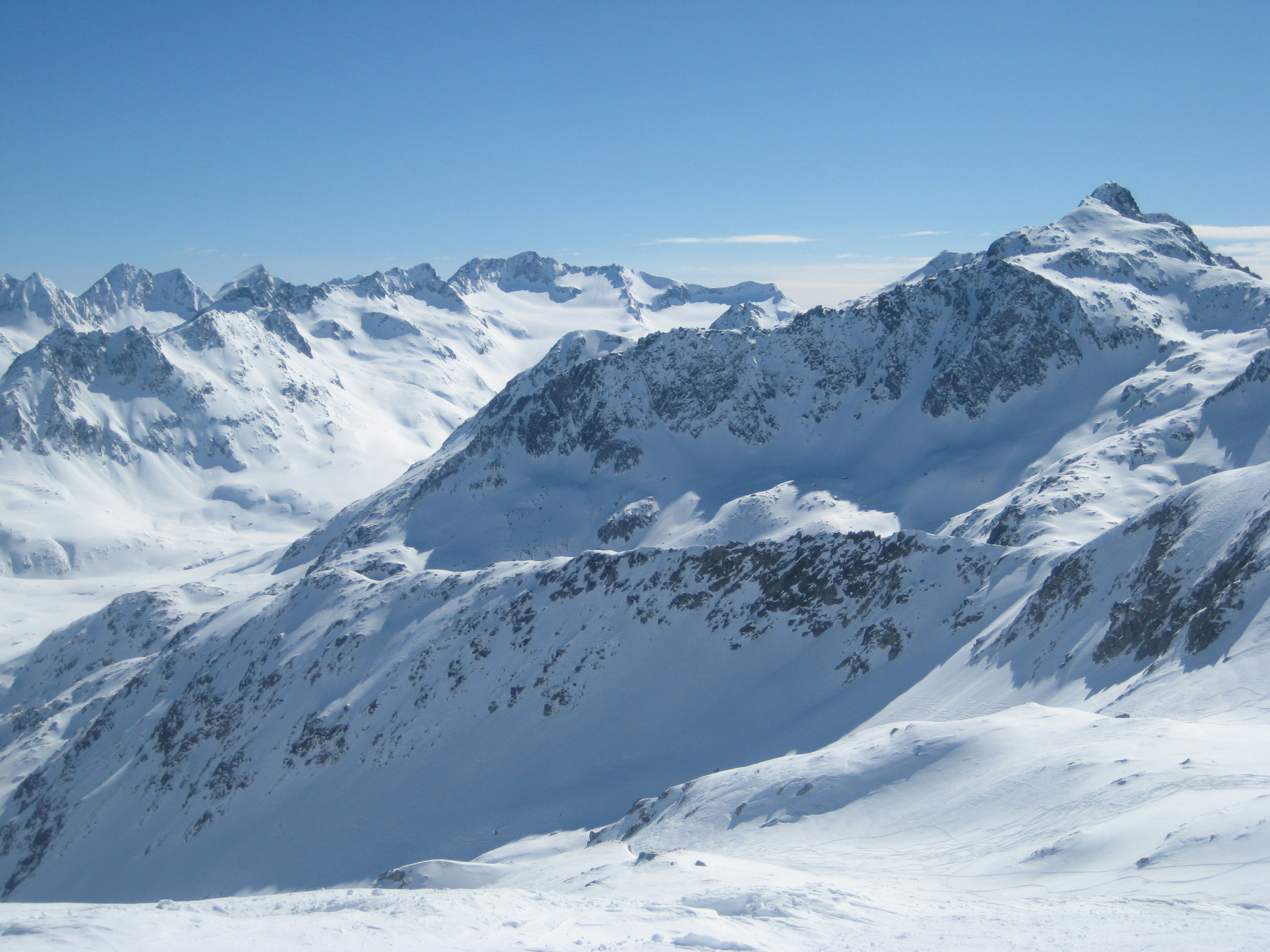
- Piz Ravetsch (centre) from the north-west

Highest point
- Elevation: 3,007 m (9,865 ft)
- Prominence: 292 m (958 ft)
- Parent peak: Piz Blas
- Coordinates: 46°35′3.3″N 8°42′10.6″E

Geography
- Location within Switzerland
- Location: Switzerland
- Parent range: Lepontine Alps

Piz Ravetsch is a mountain in the Lepontine Alps, located in the Swiss canton of Graubünden near the border with Ticino. Piz Ravetsch is the highest summit of the range that separates Val Maighels and the valley of Lake Curnera. A relatively large glacier, named Glatscher da Maighels lies over its western flanks.
