= Rein da Curnera =

River in Switzerland

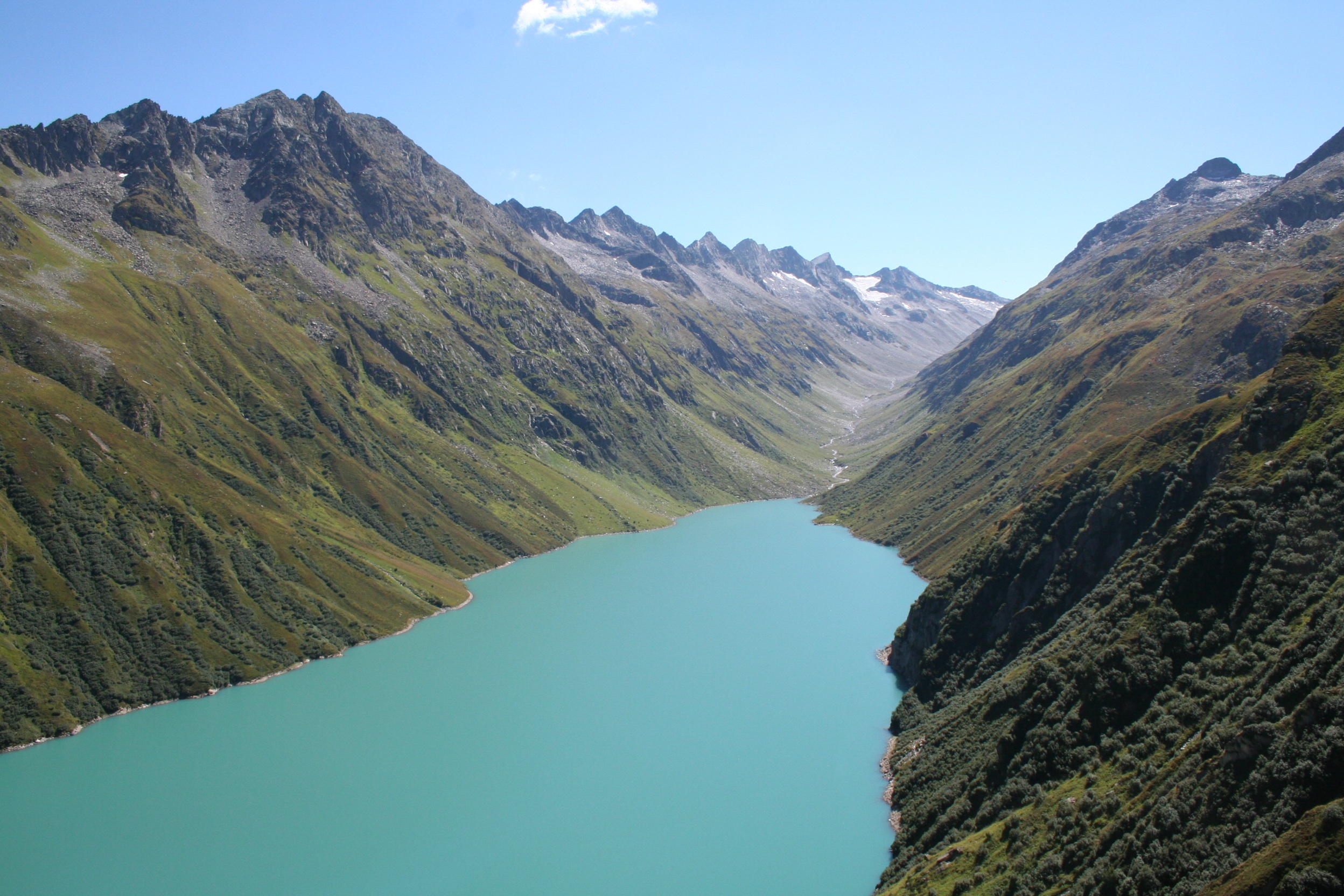
- Reservoir Lai da Curnera with its inflow Rein da Curnera

Location
- Country: Switzerland
- Canton: Graubünden

Physical characteristics
- Source
  - location: Multiple springs and glaciers at the Southern end of the valley,
  - coordinates: 46°34′54″N 8°42′55″E
- Mouth
  - location: Confluence with Anterior Rhine near Tschamut in the Tujetsch valley,
  - coordinates: 46°39′9″N 8°42′43″E
- Length: 8 km (5.0 mi)

Basin features
- Progression: Vorderrhein→ Rhine→ North Sea
- Tributaries
  - left: Rein da Maighels
- Waterbodies: Lai da Curnera

The Rein da Curnera (in German: Curnerarhein) is a right tributary of the Anterior Rhine and one of the main tributaries of the Rhine (see Sources of the Rhine). It is fed from multiple sources and glaciers at the southern end of the valley. The river is about 8 kilometres (5 mi) long and flows north through the Val Curnera. Approximately in the middle of its route, a dam was constructed by Kraftwerke Vorderrhein AG (the local hydropower company), which formed Lai da Curnera. At this point, the Rein da Curnera takes up a left tributary, the Rein da Maighels.

The Rein da Curnera flows into the Anterior Rhine near Tschamut in the Tujetsch valley.
