= Littenbach =

River in St. Gallen, Switzerland

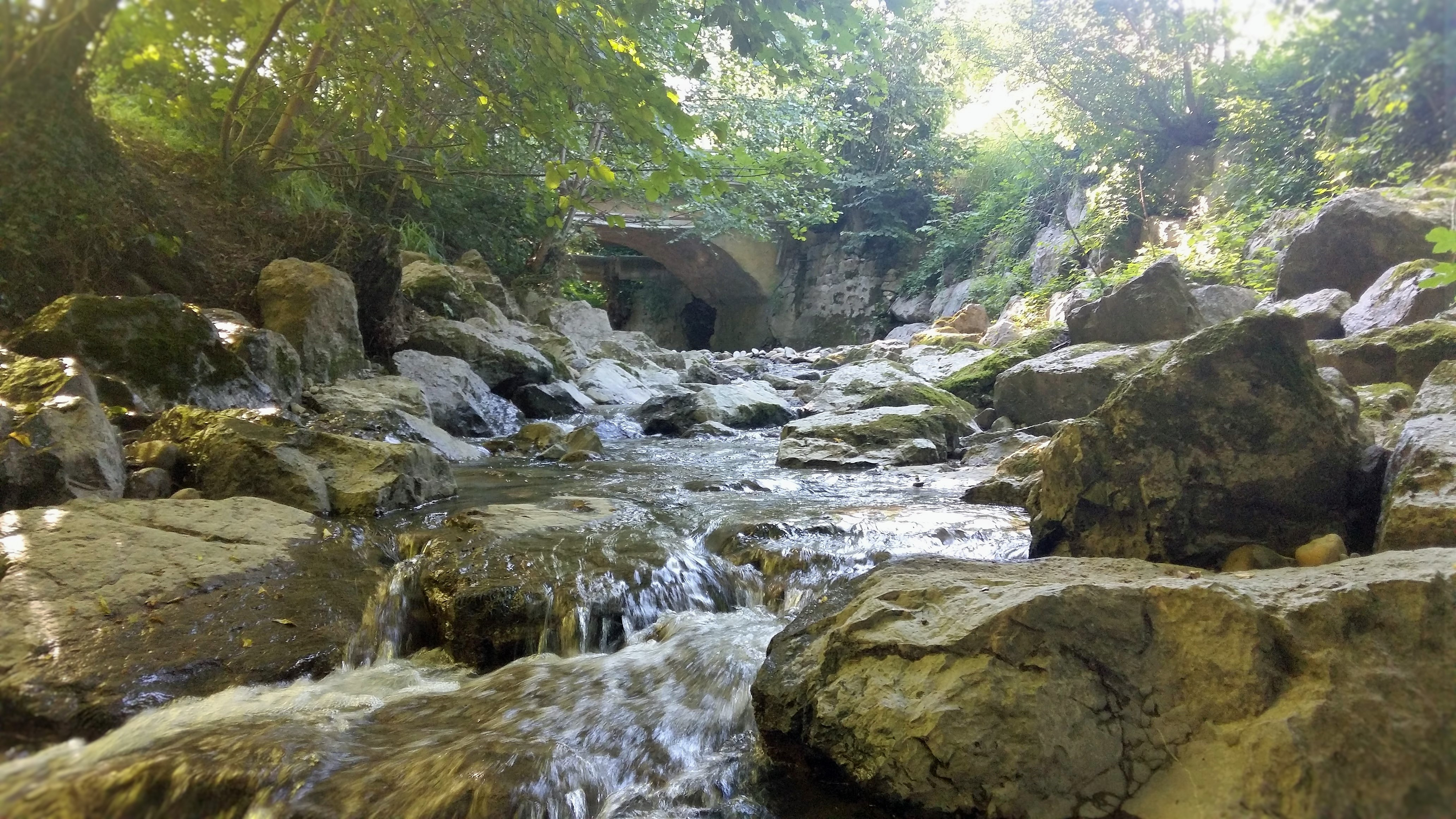

Location
- Country: Switzerland
- Cantons: Appenzell Ausserrhoden; Appenzell Innerrhoden; St. Gallen
- Towns: Berneck

Physical characteristics
- Mouth: Rheintaler Binnenkanal
  - location: Au
  - coordinates: 47°26′18″N 9°38′33″E

The Littenbach is an 11-kilometer-long inland stream in the Alpine Rhine in the Canton of St. Gallen, Switzerland.
