= Lai da Curnera =

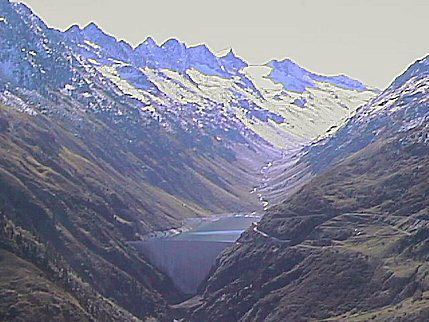

- Location within Canton of Graubünden Location within Switzerland Location within Italy Location within Alps
- Interactive map of Lai da Curnera
- Location: Grisons
- Coordinates: 46°37′36″N 8°42′49″E
- Type: reservoir
- Catchment area: 24.1 km^{2} (9.3 sq mi)
- Basin countries: Switzerland
- Surface area: 0.81 km^{2} (0.31 sq mi)
- Max. depth: 136 m (446 ft)
- Water volume: 41.1 million cubic metres (33,300 acre⋅ft)
- Surface elevation: 1,956 m (6,417 ft)

Lai da Curnera is a reservoir on the river Rein da Curnera in the municipality of Tujetsch, in the Grisons, Switzerland. The reservoir is linked to Lai da Sontga Maria and Lai da Nalps in the neighboring valley. The lake's volume is 41.1 million cubic metres (33,300 acre⋅ft) and its surface area 81 ha (200 acres).

All surrounding rivers are diverted into the reservoir, among them the Rein da Tuma, coming from Lai da Tuma (Tomasee), near the Oberalp Pass and known as the source of the river Rhine. The Vorderrhein, or Anterior Rhine as the Rhine is called in this area, passes just about 2 kilometers north to the barrier of the lake. A multiday trekking route is signposted along the young Rhine called Senda Sursilvana, from where the barrier can be spotted easily.

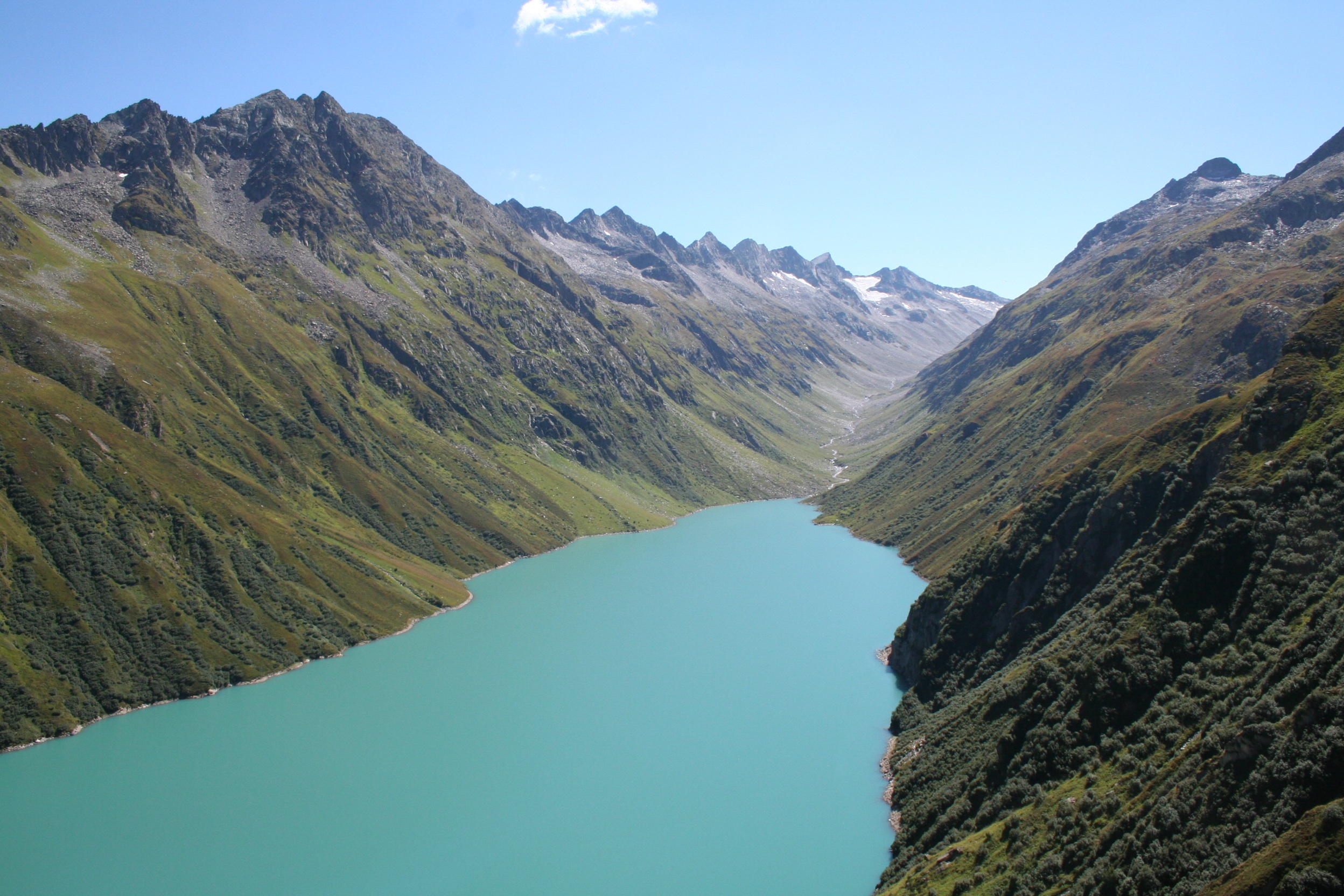
View South

== See also ==
- List of lakes of Switzerland
- List of mountain lakes of Switzerland
