= Noviodunum (Switzerland) =

Archaeological site in Vaud, Switzerland

Coordinates: 46.381°N 6.238°E

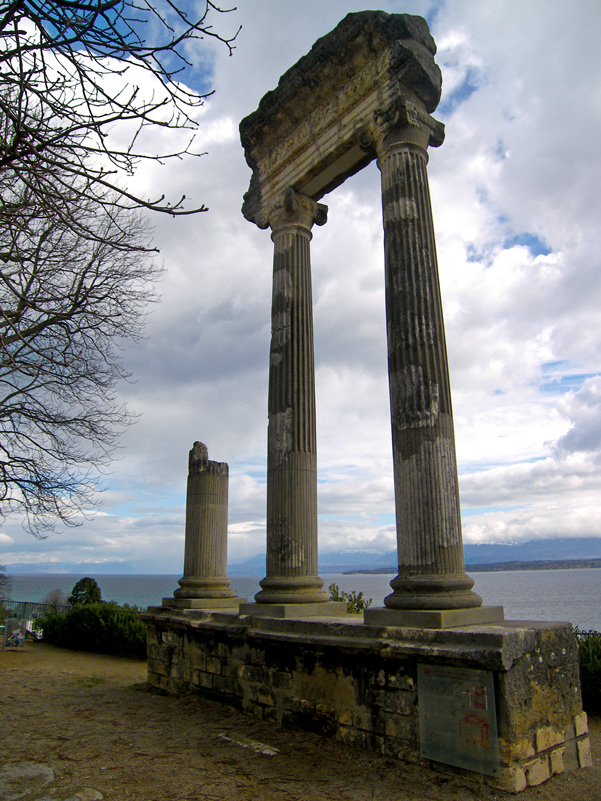
Roman column from Noviodunum

Noviodunum or Colonia Iulia Equestris was a Roman era settlement in what is now Nyon in the Canton of Vaud in Switzerland.

== Origin of the name ==
Noviodunum is a name of Celtic origin, meaning "new fort": It comes from nowyo, Celtic for "new", and dun, the Celtic for "hillfort" or "fortified settlement", cognate of English town. It was the urban center of the larger Colonia. Although the name of the city, Noviodunum, is certainly Celtic in origin, it is first mentioned in written sources in about 400 AD.

The name Colonia Iulia Equestris is more descriptive. A colonia was originally a Roman outpost established in conquered territory to secure it. Eventually, however, the term came to denote the highest status of Roman city. Iulia refers to either Julius Caesar or Gaius Julius Caesar Augustus. The first settlers in the Colonia were army veterans, especially cavalrymen or equester, which led to the name Equestris.

== History ==
=== Foundation ===
Colonia Iulia Equestris was most likely founded by Julius Caesar in 46–44 BC. It was established on land taken from the Helvetii as a Colonia for cavalry veterans. The original functions of the Colonia were to provide land for veterans and military bases in conquered territory. Noviodunum was part of a loose network of settlements that radiated out from Lugdunum (modern Lyon, France) and helped to control the Rhone Valley. It served, along with other Roman colonies in the area, to control the Helvetii who were settled in the area against their will after their defeat at the Battle of Bibracte in 58 BC.

=== The early Colonia ===
The first colonists received land lots, which had been divided into uniform units, known as centurions. Traces of the ordered system have been found in recent studies. Under Emperor Augustus, the colony experienced a boom. A rectangular grid pattern divided the area of the wall-less city. A monumental center, housing everything needed for the economic, religious and social life of the colony, was established. Only portions of this first forum have been discovered. At its east end was a two-story basilica, whose ground floor was divided, by a centrally located row of wooden columns, into two naves. Within the basilica, there were, probably, public baths or thermae.

Under Tiberius, the forum was expanded and redesigned into a familiar pattern for the provinces. The sacred area was surrounded on three sides by colonnades, which were built on half-sunken cryptoporticus. In the center would have been the main temple, though the remains of that building have not been discovered. A new basilica was built. It now consisted of a nave with two vestibules, the nave was enclosed by a colonnade, which formed a gallery. Two outbuildings, including most likely the seat of the Curia, flanked the building. A market building (macellum) with a central courtyard around which were the sales rooms, and the baths (tepidarium with geometric shapes and mosaics) were renovated. The forum witnessed further transformations, particularly the establishment of another large building. During the same building phase a large mosaic on the central part of the north portico was built.

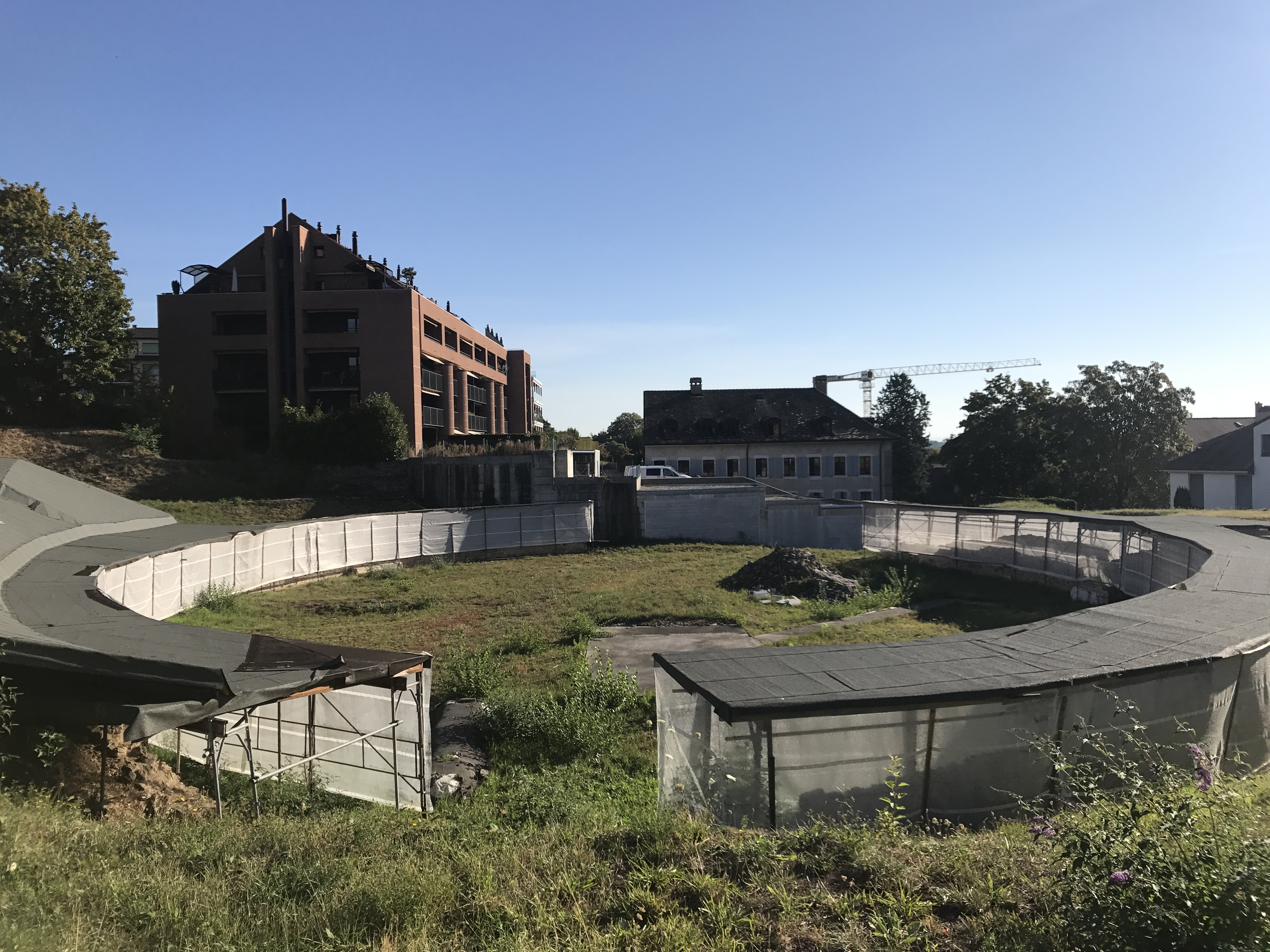
Amphitheatre of Noviodunum

The amphitheater, which was discovered in 1996, was probably built in the early 2nd century AD. Its arena, which was flanked by two prisons and provided with sewers, is about 50 by 36 metres (164 by 118 ft). The ruins of a theatre, that should have been in the Colonia, have not been discovered.

The residential quarters consisted of modest homes, in addition to some domi with beautiful gardens and pools. The buildings were originally made of wood and clay, but after the mid-1st century AD were built from masonry. Some villa suburbana stood in the west of the village, while the artisan and merchant quarter, presumably, developed in the southwest. A 10 km (6.2 mi) long aqueduct, which ran from the Divonne area to the colony, provided the water supply. Sewage canals, that followed the road networks, dumped sewage into the lake.

The city remained unwalled throughout its history. However, from the location of cemeteries, it appears that the city did not expand. Cremation graves were discovered in the north of the square of Perdtemps and in Clémenty.

Iulia Equestris was a colony in Roman law with close ties to Vienne, the capital of the Allobroges. The city was governed by two duumviri which presided over the decurion council. At times the duumviri were replaced by a praefectus pro duumviri. The city also had an official list of aediles and a praefectus arcendis latrociniis who was commissioned to combat banditry. The Flaminica Augustae were responsible, along with a six-member college of priests (seviri Augustales), for the imperial cult.

=== Decline ===
After a long period of peace and prosperity, signs of crisis and general insecurity were increasing in the early 3rd c As a result of Alamanni invasions of 259 or 260 AD, the forum and the public buildings in the city were razed. The stone blocks were scattered all over the Lake Geneva region. The stones were re-used as building material, especially in Geneva, where about 300 were used in the construction of the wall. But the settlement was not abandoned and a number of signs of settlements after the 3rd century have been discovered. These include the large necropolis at Clémenty which has tombs from the 5th to 8th centuries, the stone box graves in the Grand-Rue, near an early medieval building with apses, and the mention of a Civitas Equestrium in the Notitia Gallic around 400 AD. Nyon-Noviodunum, which had already lost much of its prestige and reputation was as a regional capital, now separated from Geneva. Geneva became the center and seat of the diocese which initially fought to administer the territory that had been part of the Colonia.

=== Rediscovery ===
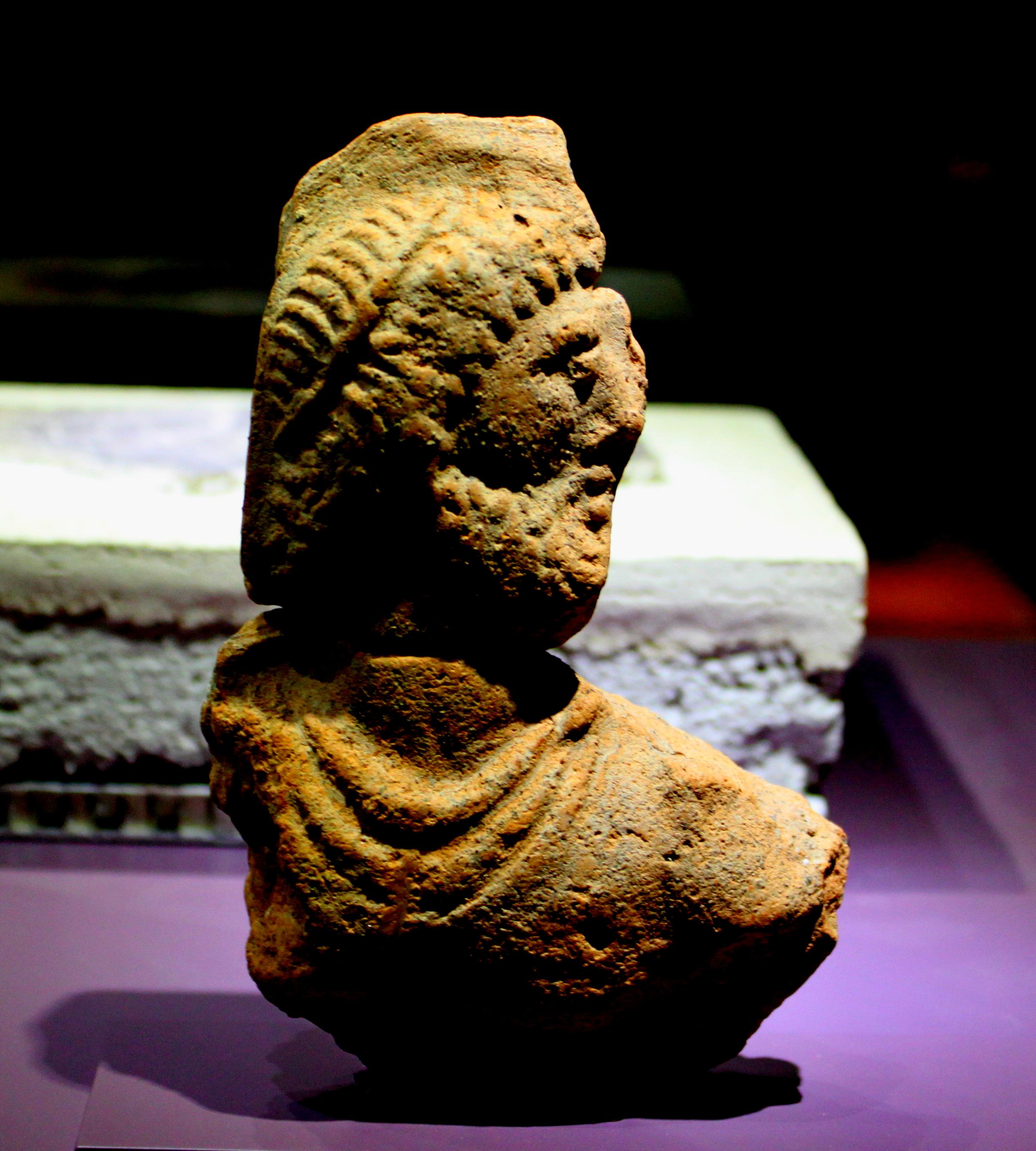
Ancient Roman terracotta in the Nyon Roman Museum

In the 18th century, there were sporadic discoveries of Roman items from the Colonia. Due to the research of local scholars, especially Théophile Wellauer, in the 19th century these discoveries became frequent and regular. In 1841, the municipality set up a museum to store, catalogue, research and display the items that had been found. In 1875, Johann Jakob Müller published in Zurich the first overall map of the Colonia. In 1974, the significant discovery of the basilica in the forum, gave the research additional momentum. In 1979, a new museum dedicated to the Roman Colonia was built near the basilica.

== Colonia site ==
The territory of the Colonia stretched between the Jura Mountains, Rhone river and Lake Geneva. The border with the Helvetii probably ran to Aubonne and later formed the dividing line between the dioceses of Lausanne and Geneva. However, it is possible (based on some milestones) that the border ran to the Venoge and Morge rivers (Morga is Gaulish for border). The center of the Roman city was on an elevated plateau between the Asse and Cossy rivers, at the same point as the later medieval castle and old town of Nyon. The easily defended hill dominated the lake on which human settlements date back the Neolithic era. On the hill itself, no traces of a pre-Roman settlement have been discovered.

== Trade ==
The Colonia, which was located along roads with Lyon, the capital of the Gauls, Aventicum, Augusta Raurica, Valais and Italy and connected by waterways to the Mediterranean and the Rhine was benefited from trade across the Western Roman Empire. A port, likely in what is now district Rive, allowed the Colonia to participate in the Lake Geneva trade. Imports included: luxury tableware or products from the Mediterranean, such as amphorae of wine, oil, or fish sauce. However very little is known about exports from the Colonia. The only evidence of exports is a bronze tablet, found near Regensburg (Castra Regina). It bore the name of the bronze craftsman L. Cusseius Ocellio, who worked in Noviodunum.

The agricultural estates on the outskirts of the Colonia are expected to have been profitable, but the lack of archaeological findings about the type of management, the size of farms and density of the farmers, mean that very little is known about the early farms. Later, a number of villas, large landed estate with luxurious mansions, were built around the town. The villas brought city comforts and Roman lifestyle on the rural areas. One example of this form of Romanization, the villa of Commugny with its peristyle, baths, mosaics and high quality wall paintings was built in the years between 35 and 45 AD.

== See also ==
- Switzerland in the Roman era
