= Morge =

Morge may refer to:

- Morge (Isère), a tributary of the Isère
- Morge (Allier), a tributary of the Allier
- Morge (Lake Geneva), a tributary of Lake Geneva
- Le Morge, a frazione (subdivision) in the Abruzzo region of Italy

== People with the surname ==
- Günter Morge (1925–1984), German entomologist

== See also ==
- Morges
