= Morge (tributary of the Rhône) =

River in Valais, Switzerland

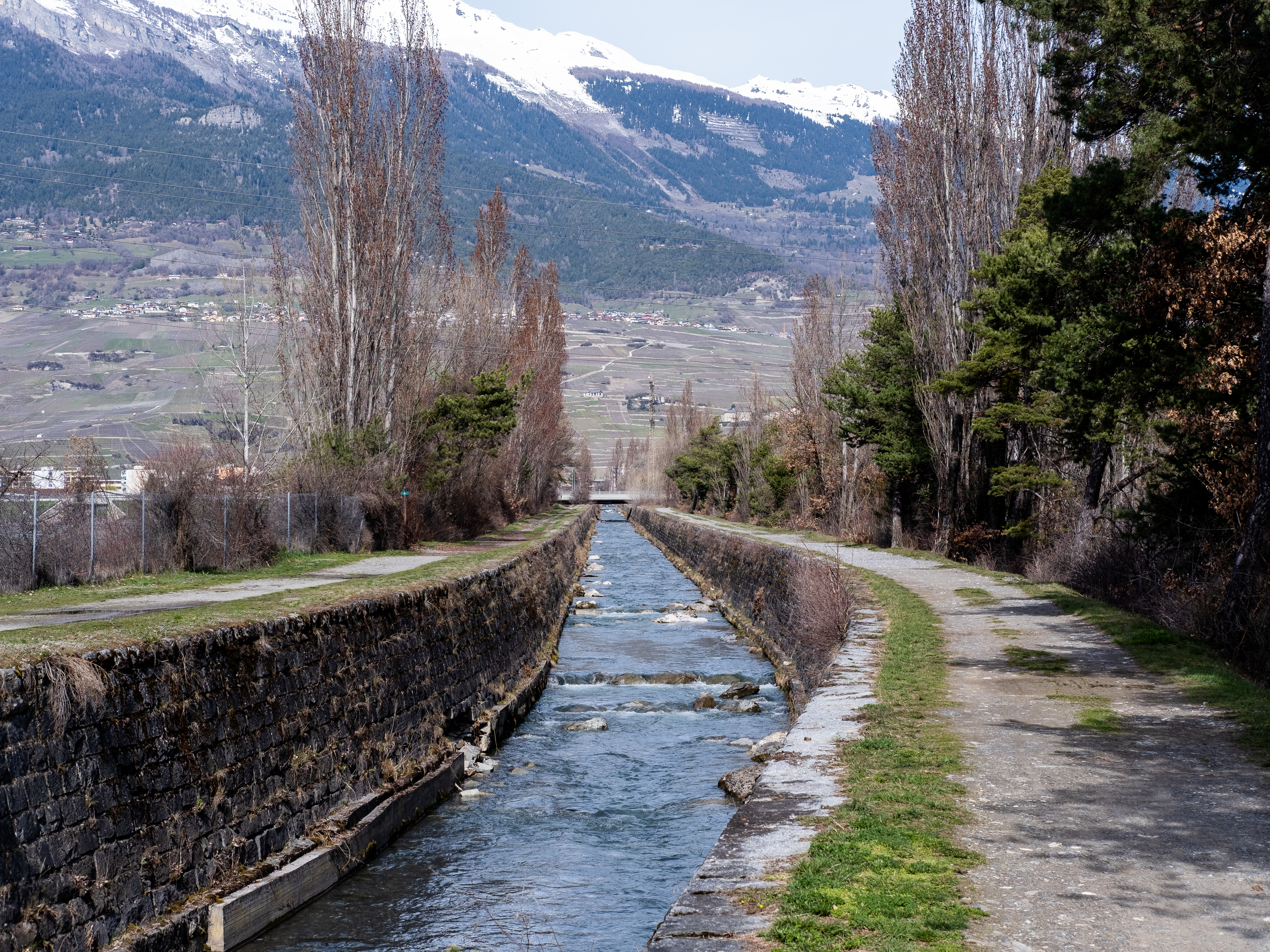
- The Morge in Conthey.
- Native name: Morge de Conthey (French)

Location
- Country: Switzerland
- District: Valais

Physical characteristics
- Source: Tsanfleuron glacier
  - location: On the south side
  - coordinates: 46°19′53″N 7°17′00″E
  - length: 2,240 m
- Source confluence: Rhône
  - location: Between Conthey and Savièse
  - coordinates: 46°12′31″N 7°18′32″E
  - elevation: 477 m
- Length: 15 km (9.3 mi)
- Basin size: 79,9 km^{2}

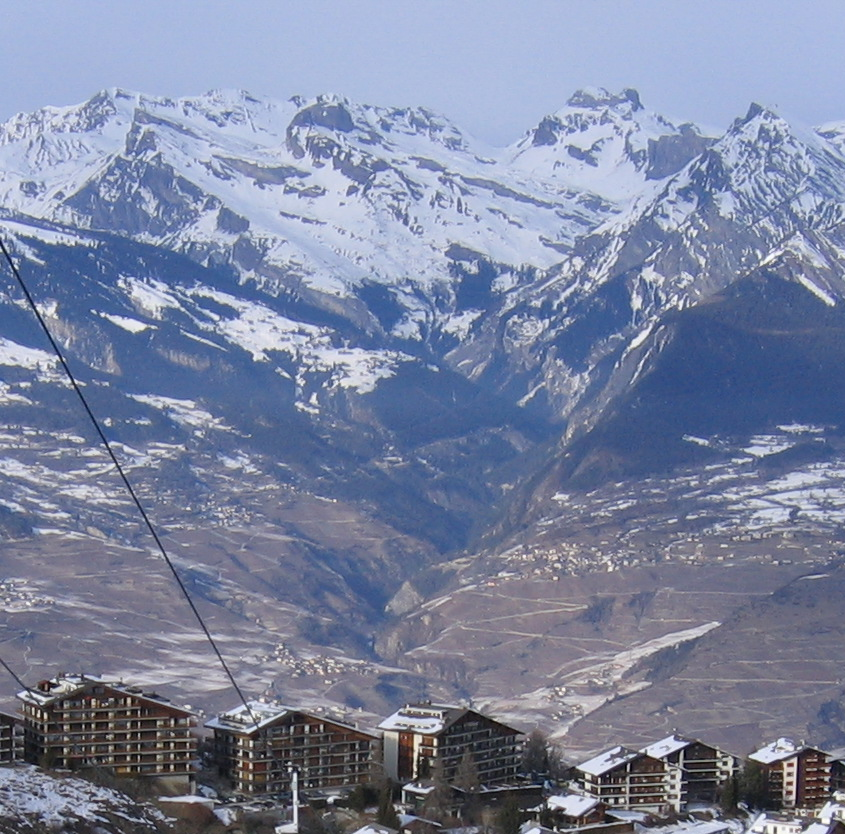
The Morge Valley, seen from Haute-Nendaz.

The Morge, also called Morge de Conthey, is a Swiss river in the canton of Valais, a tributary of the Rhône on its right bank.

== Hydronymy ==
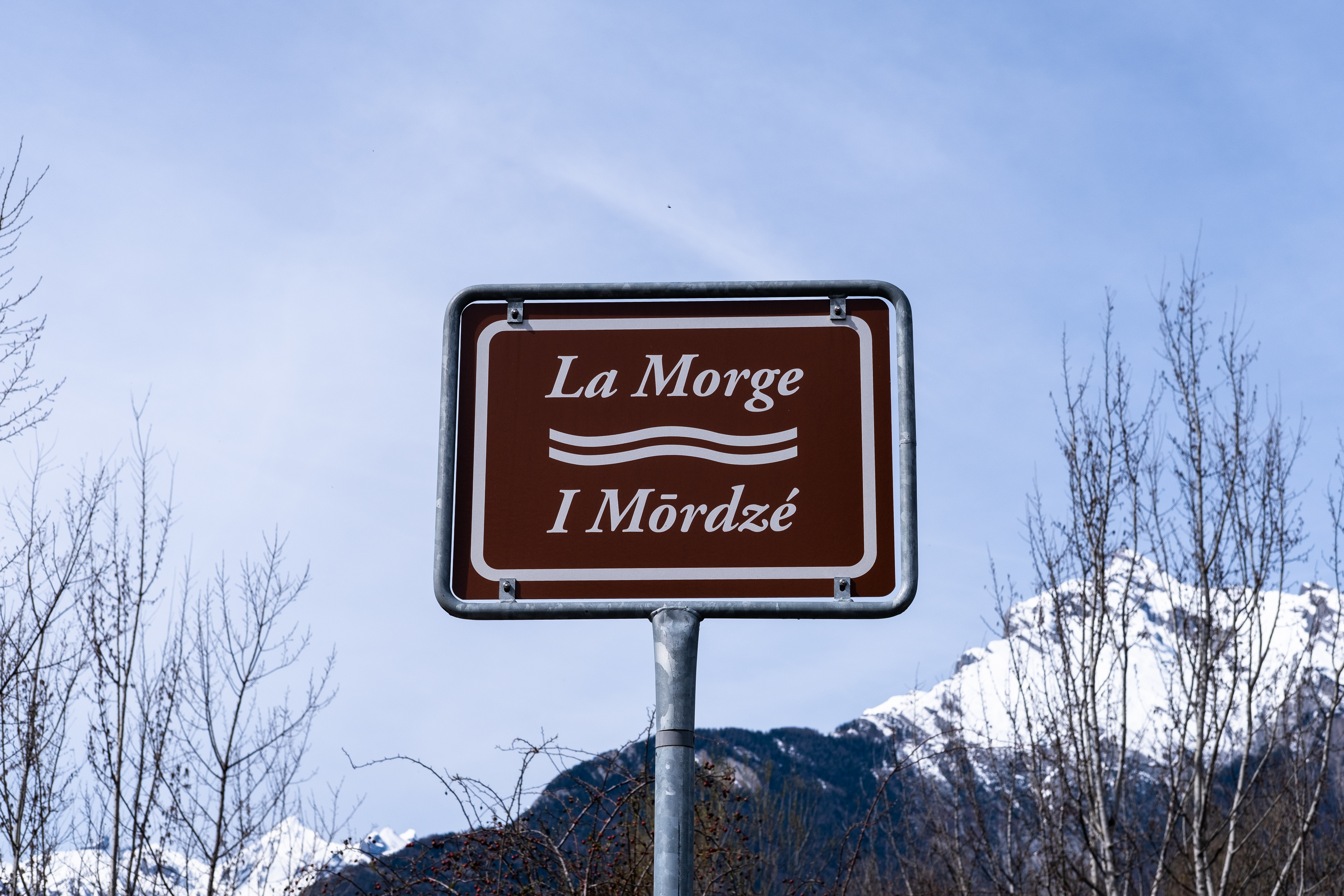
Sign for La Morge in Conthey with name in French and local “patois” (Valais dialect).

The name of the Morge derives from the Celtic term morga, meaning "border." It shares this etymology with the Morge in Saint-Gingolph and the Morges in the canton of Vaud. To avoid confusion, it is sometimes referred to as the "Morge de Conthey."

== Geography ==
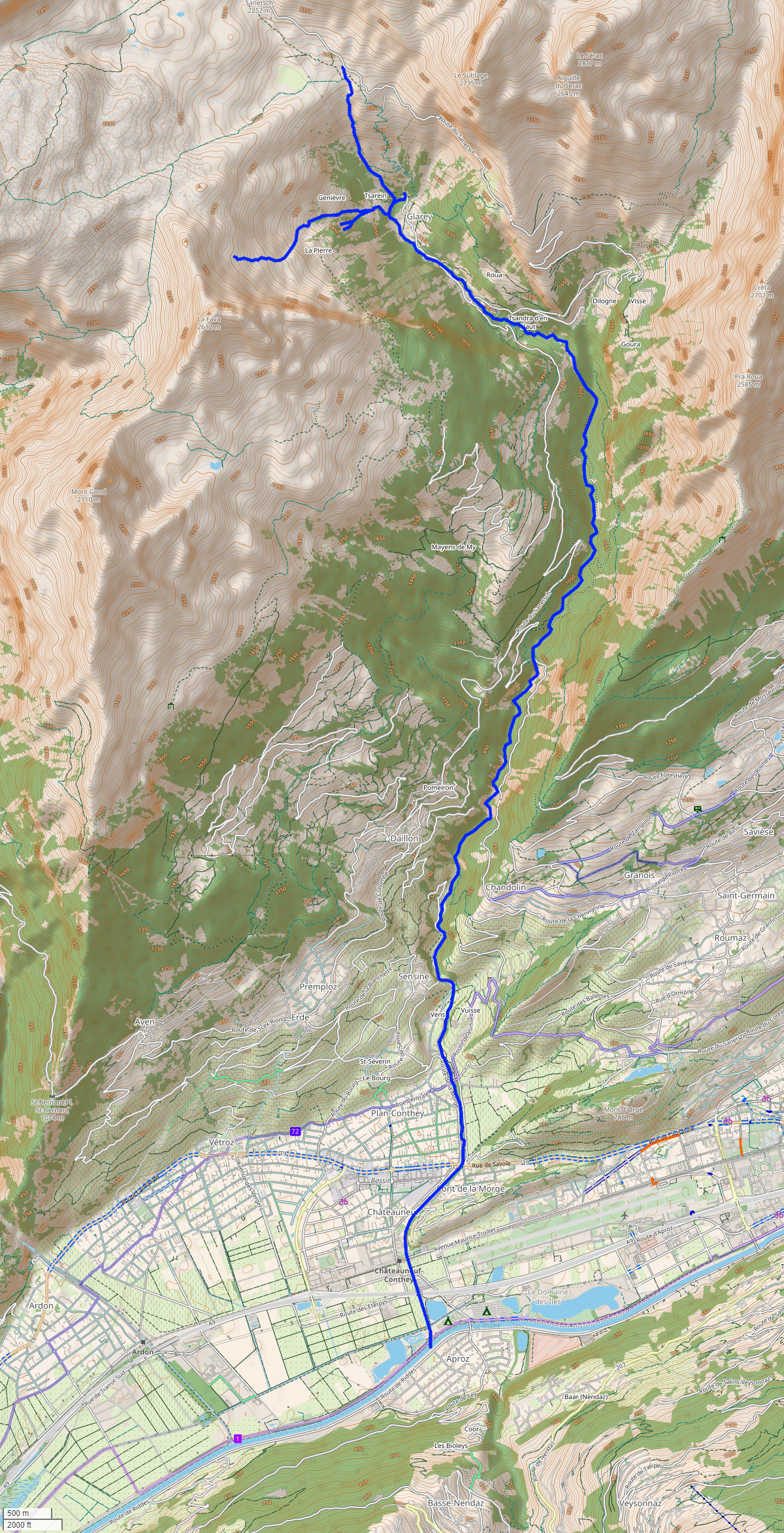
Map of La Morge.

=== Location ===
The Morge forms the boundary between the municipalities of Conthey and Savièse along its valley, and between Conthey and Sion in the Rhône plain. It also marks the border between the districts of Conthey and Sion. Its adjacent drainage basins include the Lizerne to the west, the Sarine to the northwest, the Geltenbach to the north, the Lienne to the northeast, the Sionne to the east, and the Rhône to the south.

=== Course ===
The Morge originates in two branches on the southern slope of the Sanetsch. The main branch rises south of the Arpelistock and the Wildhorn, and is joined at approximately 1,300 m elevation by a secondary branch formed by the torrents of the Contheysanne, the Zanfleuronne, the Zermey, and the Eau de la Lex. From this confluence, the river flows southward, carving deep gorges into its valley. It emerges from the valley at an altitude of 512 m, east of Conthey, and continues alongside a road to the bridge on the Simplon route. There, it is channeled westward to bypass the Maladaires ridge, and ultimately flows into the Rhône at an elevation of 477 m, after a course of approximately 15 km.

=== Hydrology ===
The drainage basin of the Morge covers an area of 79.9 km², with elevations ranging from 3,207 m to 470 m and an average altitude of 1,819 m. The land cover consists of 26% rock, 23% forest (including 22% coniferous and 1% mixed forest), 20% herbaceous vegetation, 8% shrubby vegetation, 8% loose rock, and 6% agricultural land. The remaining surface is composed of glaciers (4%), urban areas (3%), and wetlands (2%).

Between 1981 and 2010, the average annual precipitation in the Morge drainage basin was 1,895 mm, with precipitation generally increasing with altitude. July records the highest average monthly precipitation at 201 mm, while May has the highest snow water equivalent, averaging 445 mm.

The Morge exhibits different hydrological regimes along its course. From its source to the confluence with the Rogne, it follows a glacio-nival regime, and from that point to its confluence with the Rhône, it follows a nivio-glacial regime. Its Strahler number is 3 up to the Zanfleuron alpine pasture, increasing to 4 after the confluence with several tributaries.

== History ==
Before the Christian era, the Morge marked the boundary between the Seduni, whose territory extended along the left bank to Visp, and the Veragri, who inhabited the right bank up to the Mauvoisin torrent near Saint-Maurice. During the Middle Ages, it served as the border between the episcopal seigneury of Sion and the Savoyard castellany of Conthey. The bishop of Sion held customs rights in this area, and several treaties between the bishops of Sion and the counts of Savoy were concluded along the Morge.

Between 1260 and 1268, and again from 1384, the Morge served as the boundary between Savoyard Valais and Episcopal Valais. This border ceased to exist after the victory of Sion at the Battle of the Planta in 1475, after which Valais expanded to include Massongex.

During the Helvetic Republic, on May 17, 1798, during the French invasion, troops from the dizains clashed with forces led by General Jean Thomas Guillaume Lorge on the banks of the Morge. Lorge attempted to cross the river near Daillon to attack Savièse in Chandolin. According to Manuscrit Carrupt, (Note: Abbot Jean-Joseph Carrupt, parish priest of Ardon from 1780 until he died in 1811, left behind two folio volumes of manuscripts, each about a thousand pages long. They were acquired by the cantonal archives in 1966 and 1977 (catalog numbers AV L 526 and L 544).) nearly 300 combatants were killed in this engagement.

== See also ==
- Morge (Lake Geneva)

== Bibliography ==
- Tamini, Jean-Emile (1929). "Les deux Morge" [The two Morges] (PDF). Petites annales valaisannes (in French). 1 (4). Lausanne: 78–80.
