= Saint-Gingolph, Switzerland =

Saint-Gingolph
- Municipality
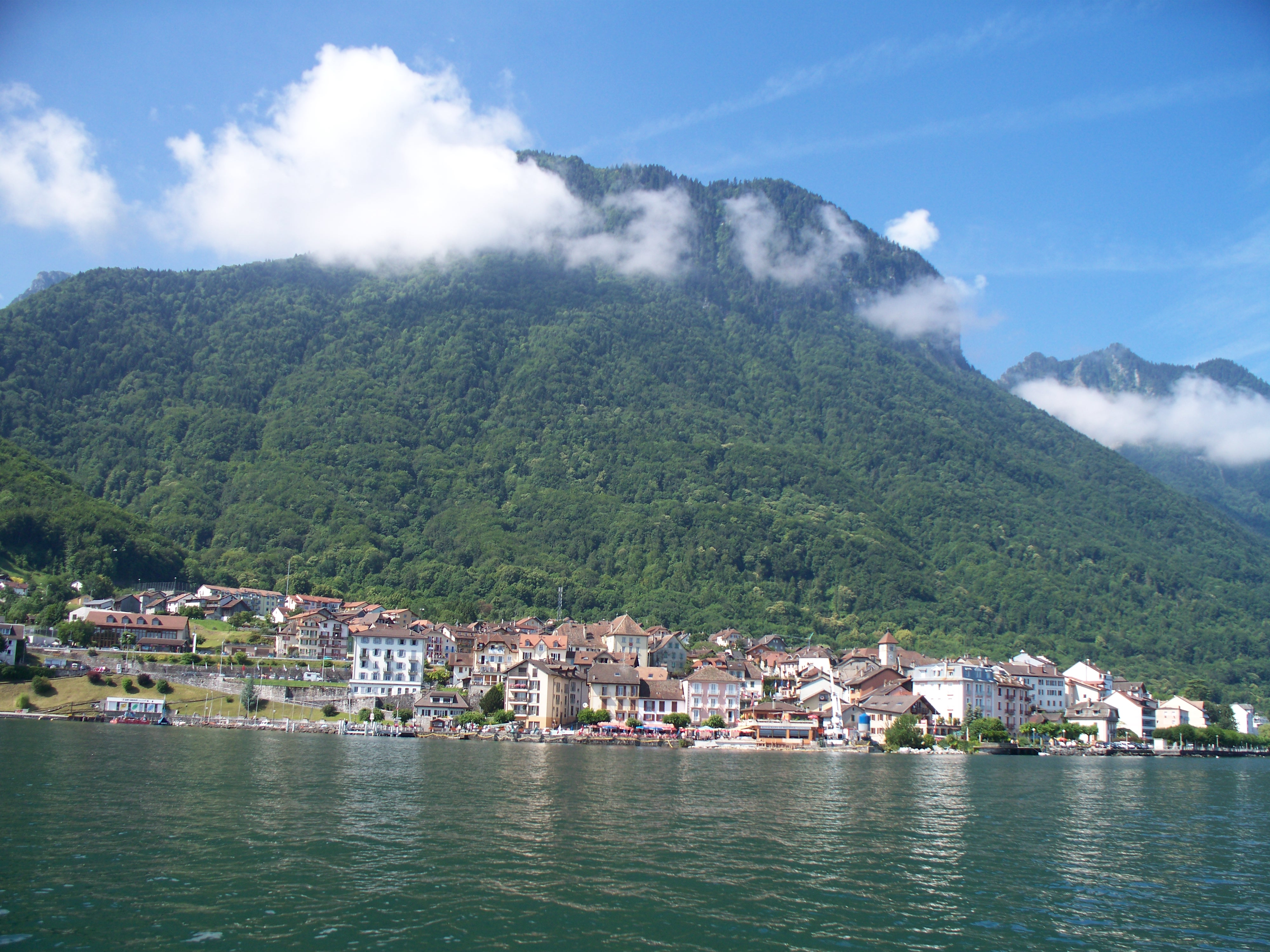
- A view of Saint-Gingolph from Lake Geneva

- Flag Coat of arms
- Location of Saint-Gingolph
- Location within Switzerland Location within Canton of Valais
- Coordinates: 46°24′N 6°48′E
- Country: Switzerland
- Canton: Valais
- District: Monthey

Area
  - Total: 14.4 km^{2} (5.6 sq mi)
- Elevation: 386 m (1,266 ft)

Population (December 2002)
  - Total: 723
  - Density: 50.2/km^{2} (130/sq mi)
- Time zone: UTC+01:00 (CET)
  - Summer (DST): UTC+02:00 (CEST)
- Postal code: 1898
- SFOS number: 6155
- ISO 3166 code: CH-VS
- Surrounded by: Corseaux (VD), Novel (FR-74), Port-Valais, Saint-Gingolph (FR-74), Vevey (VD), Vouvry
- Website: www.st-gingolph.ch

Saint-Gingolph (French pronunciation: [sɛ̃ ʒɛ̃ɡɔlf]) is a municipality in the district of Monthey in the canton of Valais in Switzerland. In 2018, it had a population of 981.

The municipality is the Swiss portion of the town of Saint-Gingolph, which straddles the France–Switzerland border provided by the Morge river. The French (western) side of the town is known as Saint-Gingolph, Haute-Savoie.

== History ==
Saint-Gingolph is first mentioned in 1153 as Sanctus Gengulfus.

== Geography ==
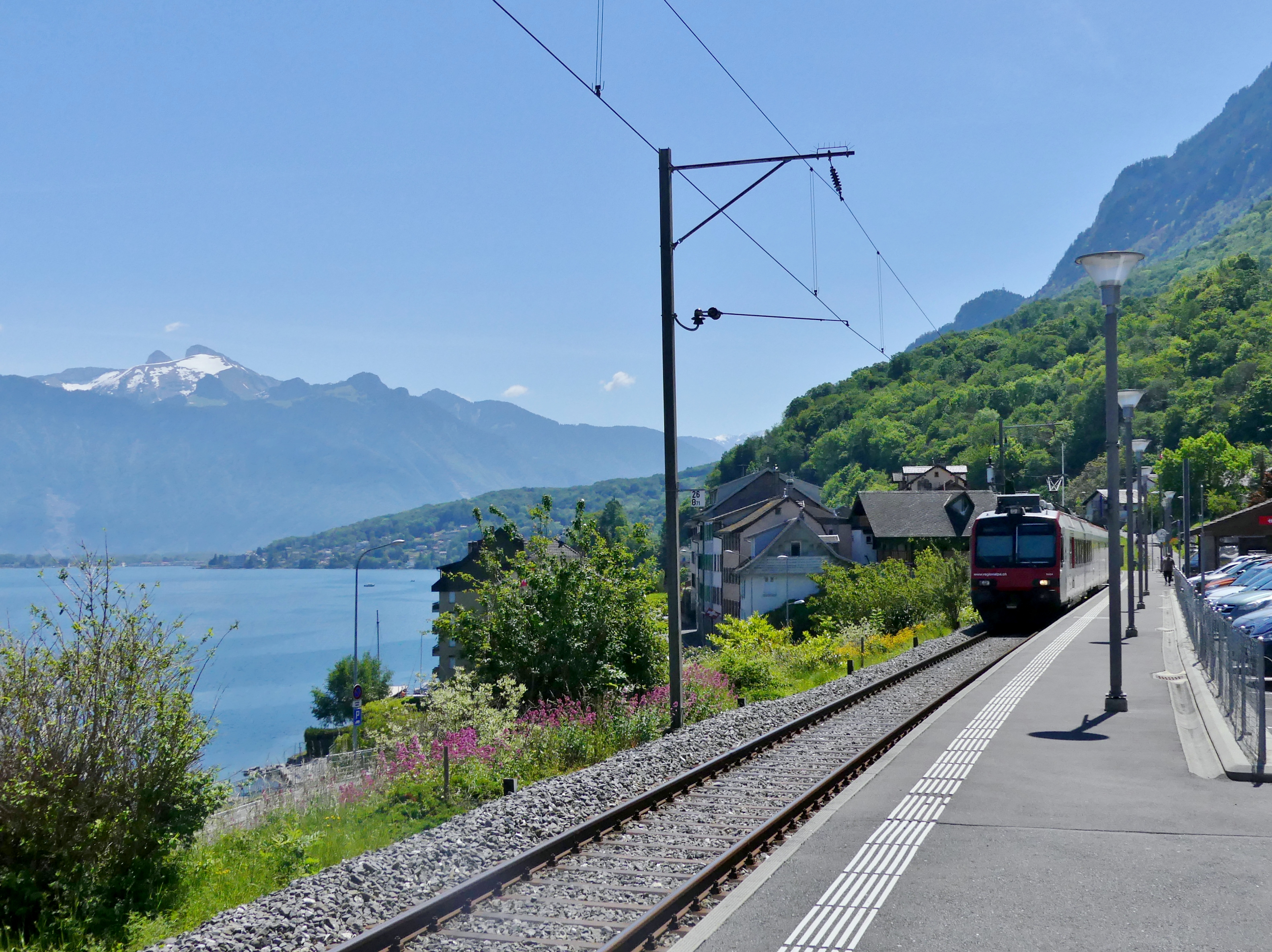
St-Gingolph railway station along Lake Geneva

Aerial view (1968)

Saint-Gingolph has an area, as of 2009, of 14.4 square kilometers (5.6 mi^{2}). Of this area, 1.61 km^{2} (0.62 mi^{2}) or 11.2% is used for agricultural purposes, while 8.77 km^{2} (3.39 mi^{2}) or 61.0% is forested. Of the rest of the land, 0.66 km^{2} (0.25 mi^{2}) or 4.6% is settled (buildings or roads), 0.06 km^{2} (15 acres) or 0.4% is either rivers or lakes and 3.27 km^{2} (1.26 mi^{2}) or 22.7% is unproductive land.

Of the built up area, housing and buildings made up 2.5% and transportation infrastructure made up 1.6%. Out of the forested land, 55.8% of the total land area is heavily forested and 3.3% is covered with orchards or small clusters of trees. Of the agricultural land, 0.0% is used for growing crops and 2.1% is pastures and 8.8% is used for alpine pastures. All the water in the municipality is in lakes. Of the unproductive areas, 13.7% is unproductive vegetation and 9.0% is too rocky for vegetation.

The municipality is located in the Monthey district, along the La Morge stream. The municipality straddles the French border. Before 1569, Saint-Gingolph, the hamlet of Le Freney and the Haute-Savoie village of Saint-Gingolph formed a single municipality.

== Coat of arms ==
The blazon of the municipal coat of arms is Per bend serrated Argent and Gules overall an Otter rampant Sable langued Gules and armed of the first in chief sinister a Mullet of Five of the second.

== Demographics ==
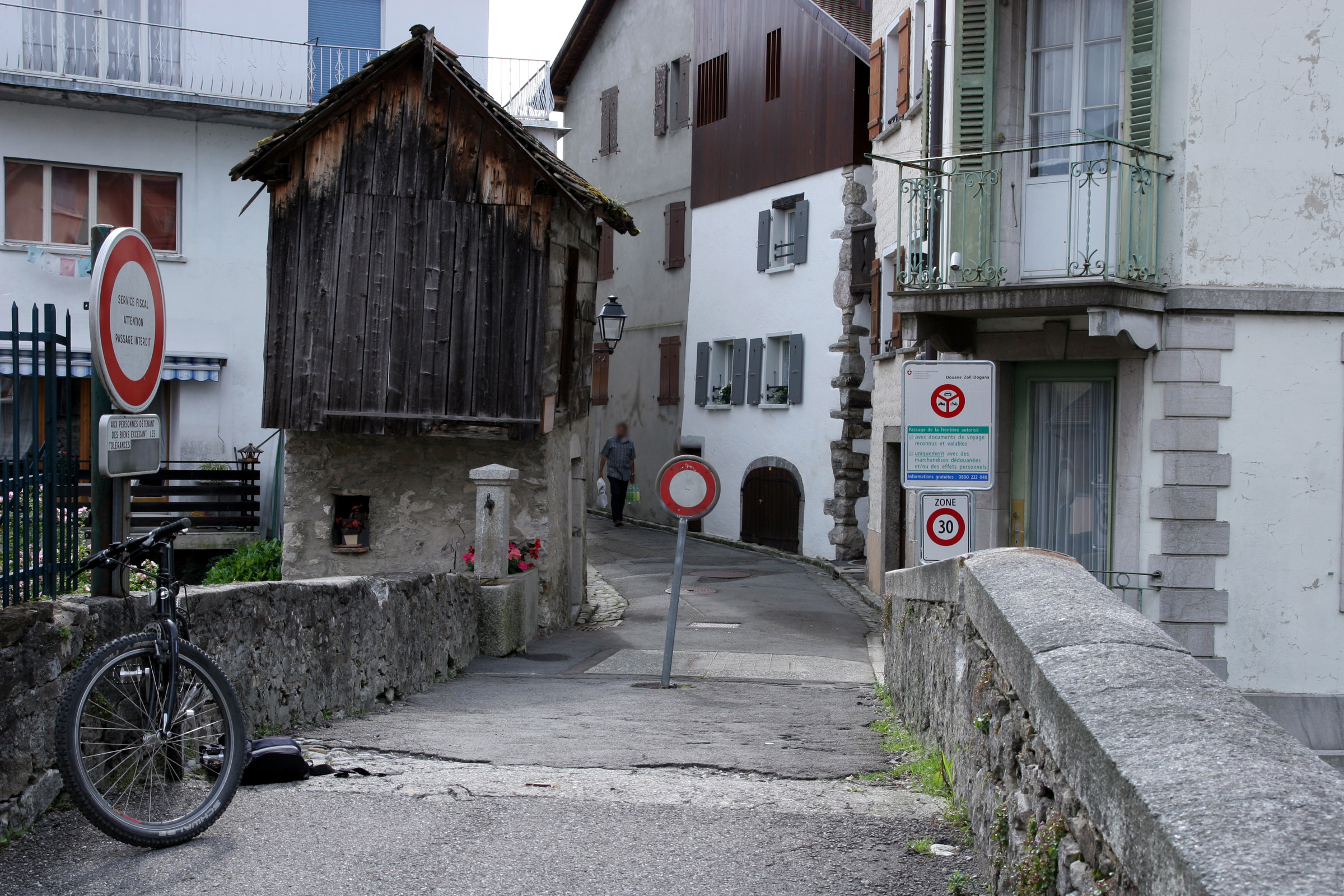
Border in Saint-Gingolph, looking toward the Swiss side. The border is guarded by a video camera mounted on a balcony.

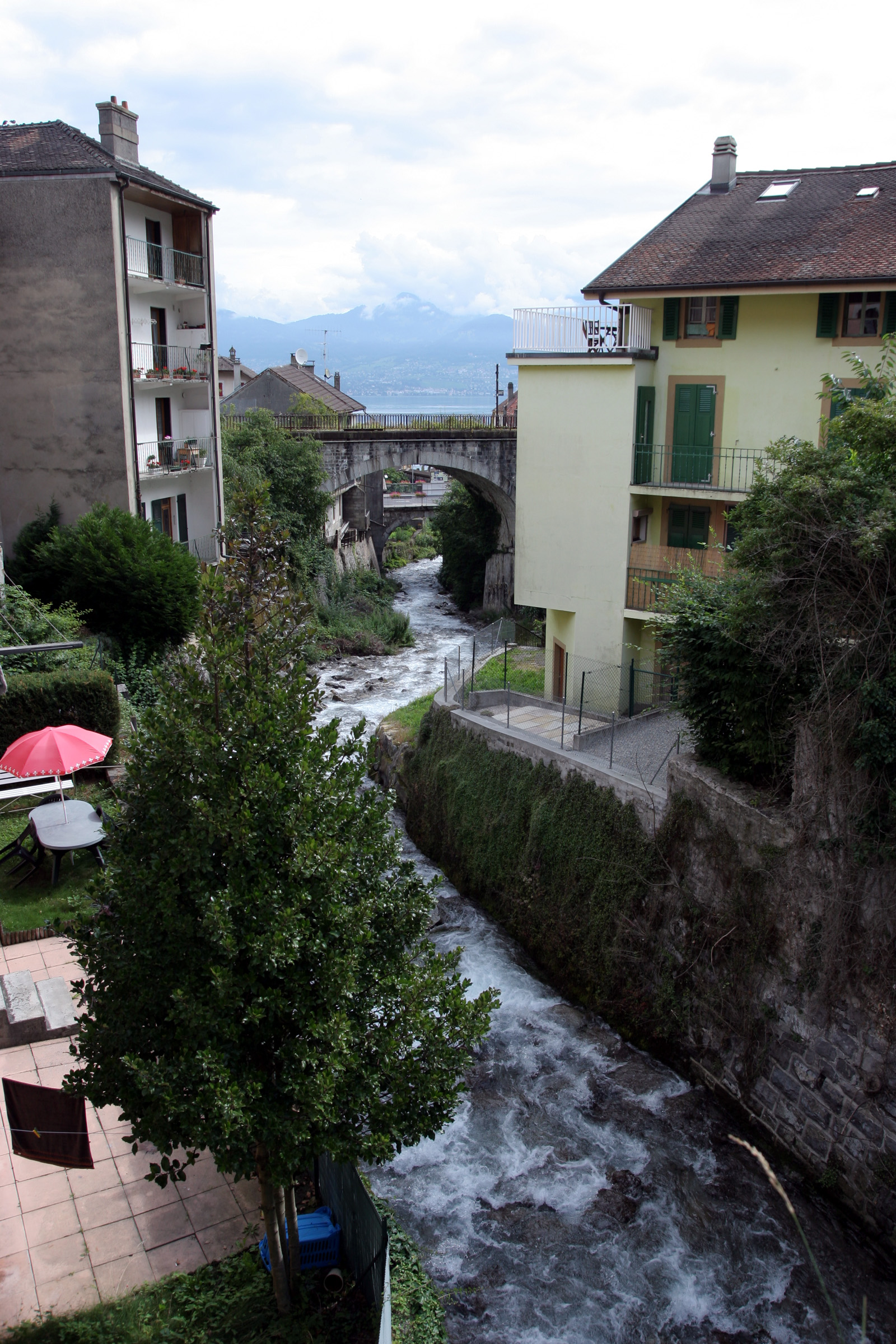
The Morge river forms the border in Saint-Gingolph. The left side is French, the right side Swiss.

Saint-Gingolph has a population (as of December 2020) of 964. As of 2008, 17.3% of the population are resident foreign nationals. Over the last 10 years (2000–2010) the population has changed at a rate of 23.3%. It has changed at a rate of 25.6% due to migration and at a rate of 0.6% due to births and deaths.

Most of the population (as of 2000) spoke French (672 or 86.9%) as their first language; German was the second most common (31 or 4.0%) and Serbo-Croatian was the third (19 or 2.5%). There were five people who speak Italian.

As of 2008, the population was 49.6% male and 50.4% female. The population was made up of 338 Swiss men (39.7% of the population) and 85 (10.0%) non-Swiss men. There were 360 Swiss women (42.3%) and 69 (8.1%) non-Swiss women. Of the population in the municipality, 243 or about 31.4% were born in Saint-Gingolph and lived there in 2000. There were 119 or 15.4% who were born in the same canton, while 178 or 23.0% were born somewhere else in Switzerland, and 130 or 16.8% were born outside of Switzerland.

As of 2000, children and teenagers (0–19 years old) madd up 22.5% of the population, while adults (20–64 years old) make up 56.1% and seniors (over 64 years old) made up 21.3%.

As of 2000, there were 321 people who were single and never married in the municipality. There were 339 married individuals, 54 widows or widowers and 59 individuals who are divorced.

As of 2000, there were 311 private households in the municipality, and an average of 2.1 persons per household. There were 122 households that consist of only one person and 22 households with five or more people. In 2000, a total of 297 apartments (52.5% of the total) were permanently occupied, while 194 apartments (34.3%) were seasonally occupied and 75 apartments (13.3%) were empty. The vacancy rate for the municipality, in 2010, was 0.99%.

The historical population is given in the following chart:

== Sights ==
The entire Saint-Gingolph area is designated as part of the Inventory of Swiss Heritage Sites.

== Politics ==
In the 2007 federal election the most popular party was the CVP which received 33.27% of the vote. The next three most popular parties were the FDP (22.46%), the SVP (21.72%) and the SP (15.99%). In the federal election, a total of 340 votes were cast, and the voter turnout was 55.7%.

== Economy ==
As of 2010, Saint-Gingolph had an unemployment rate of 5.3%. As of 2008, there were 2 people employed in the primary economic sector and about 2 businesses involved in this sector. 27 people were employed in the secondary sector and there were 11 businesses in this sector. 109 people were employed in the tertiary sector, with 32 businesses in this sector. There were 298 residents of the municipality who were employed in some capacity, of which females made up 41.6% of the workforce.

In 2008 the total number of full-time equivalent jobs was 124. The number of jobs in the primary sector was 1, all of which were in agriculture. The number of jobs in the secondary sector was 24 of which 4 or (16.7%) were in manufacturing and 20 (83.3%) were in construction. The number of jobs in the tertiary sector was 99. In the tertiary sector; 14 or 14.1% were in wholesale or retail sales or the repair of motor vehicles, 5 or 5.1% were in the movement and storage of goods, 28 or 28.3% were in a hotel or restaurant, 3 or 3.0% were the insurance or financial industry, 9 or 9.1% were technical professionals or scientists, 4 or 4.0% were in education and 3 or 3.0% were in health care.

In 2000, there were 108 workers who commuted into the municipality and 201 workers who commuted away. The municipality is a net exporter of workers, with about 1.9 workers leaving the municipality for every one entering. About 32.4% of the workforce coming into Saint-Gingolph are coming from outside Switzerland. Of the working population, 8.1% used public transportation to get to work, and 70.5% used a private car.

== Religion ==
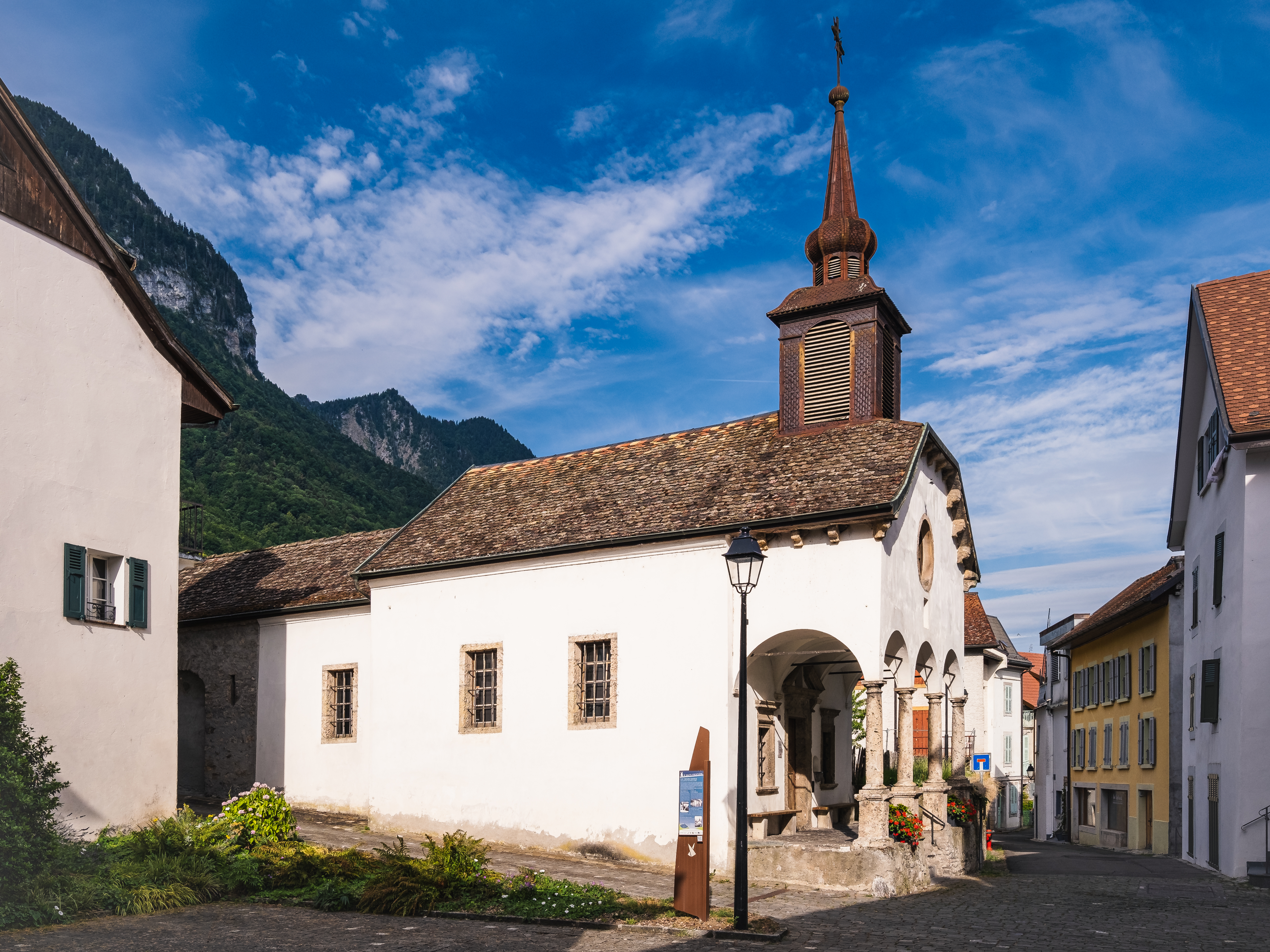
The Holy Family chapel in Saint-Gingolph

From the 2000 census, 476 or 61.6% were Roman Catholic, while 85 or 11.0% belonged to the Swiss Reformed Church. Of the rest of the population, there were four Orthodox Christians (0.52%), and there were nine residents (or about 1.16% of the population) who belonged to another Christian church. There were six (0.78%) residents who were Muslim, and eight who were Buddhist. A total of 69 people (8.93%) belonged to no church, were agnostic or atheist, and 120 (or about 15.52% of the population) did not answer the question.

== Education ==
In Saint-Gingolph about 251 or (32.5%) of the population have completed non-mandatory upper secondary education, and 96 or (12.4%) have completed additional higher education (either university or a Fachhochschule). Of the 96 who completed tertiary schooling, 49.0% were Swiss men, 22.9% were Swiss women, 13.5% were non-Swiss men and 14.6% were non-Swiss women.

As of 2000, there was one student in Saint-Gingolph who came from another municipality, while 54 residents attended schools outside the municipality.

Saint-Gingolph is home to the Bibliothèque communale library. The library has (as of 2008) 5,540 books or other media, and loaned out 1,800 items in the same year. It was open a total of 104 days with average of 8 hours per week during that year.
