= Saint-Gingolph =

Coordinates: 46°24′N 6°48′E

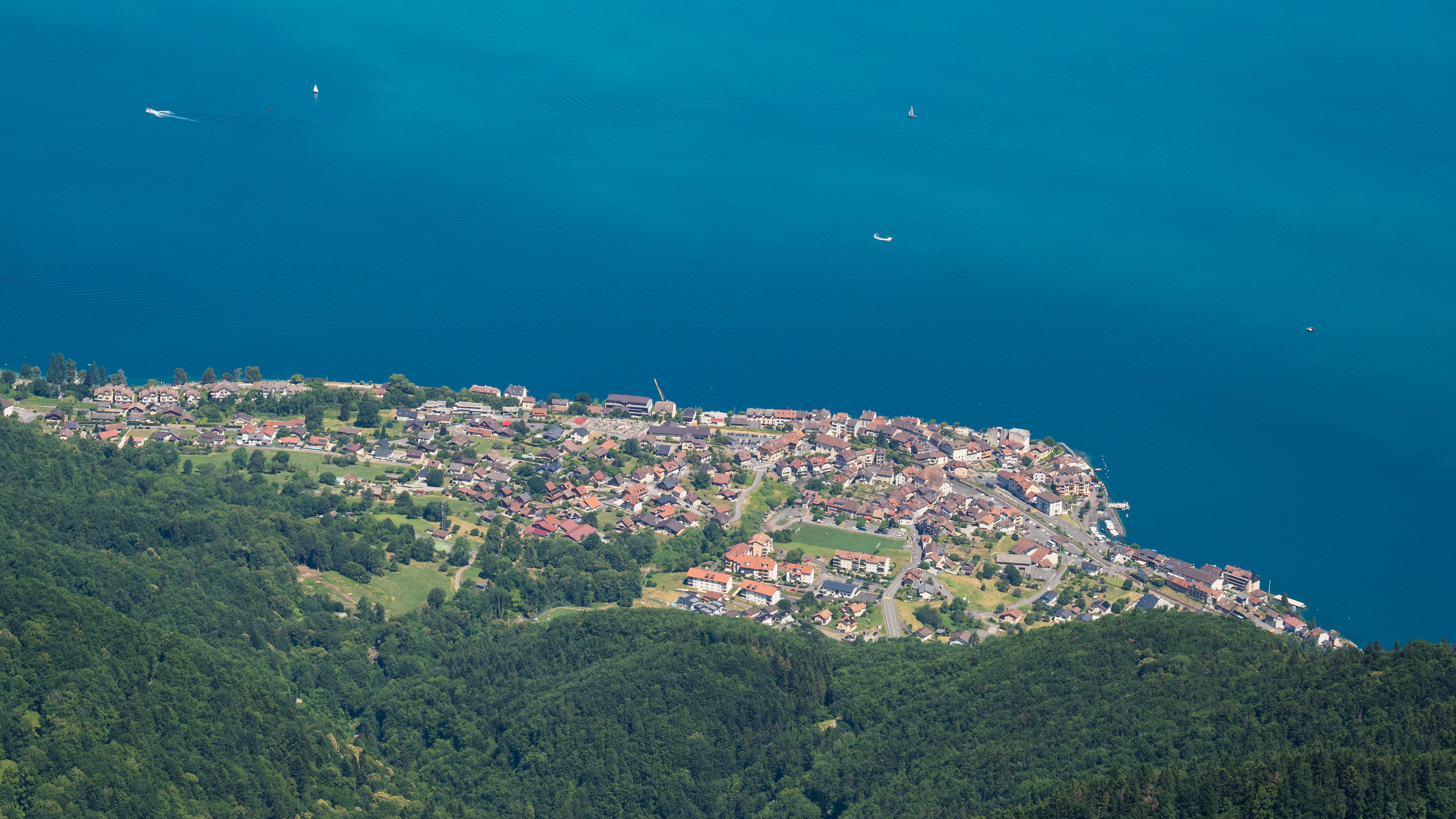
Saint-Gingolph as seen from Le Grammont

Saint-Gingolph is a small town situated on the south bank of Lake Geneva (Lac Léman). It sits at the France–Switzerland border and is administratively divided into Saint-Gingolph, Valais (Switzerland) and Saint-Gingolph, Haute-Savoie (France). Its name is derived from the eighth-century saint Gangulphus, who is said to have lived as a hermit in this region. Its division at the Morge dates from 1569: as the municipal Web site explains, it is one town consisting of a single parish (the church and cemetery are on the French side) with two municipal administrations and two distinct legal systems.

== History ==
The town played an important role during the World War II when Haute Savoie was occupied first by the Italian and then by the Nazi German Armed Forces. The fact of large-scale intermarriage and business and family connections across the frontier made it possible for the Resistance to smuggle goods, arms and refugees (including many French Jews) across the border, often using a secret tunnel (no longer in existence; it was actually a drainage pipe) located near the lake. These stories are documented in a book privately published in 1994 by the late André Zénoni, "Saint-Gingolph et sa région frontière dans la Résistance 1940-1945". (Intermarriage across the frontier is less frequent in the modern age because there are separate primary schools ("L'École André Zénoni" on the French side) and French lycéens are bussed to Evian, while Swiss students take the train to Monthey. Thereafter, each tend to seek employment in their own country. In any case, the town is so small that there are only two or three weddings recorded in a year.)

== Transport ==
The Swiss railway line from St Maurice and Martigny terminates at Saint-Gingolph (Switzerland). The French line from Evian to Saint-Gingolph has been abandoned in the late 1980s. There was discussion of reopening the line by 2012; this has been mentioned in the Swiss and French press but the outlook, according to Swiss railway workers, is dubious. The old, unelectrified, French tracks remain in place.

== Notable people ==
- Pierre de Rivaz, clockmaker
