= Saint-Gingolph, Haute-Savoie =

Saint-Gingolph
- Commune
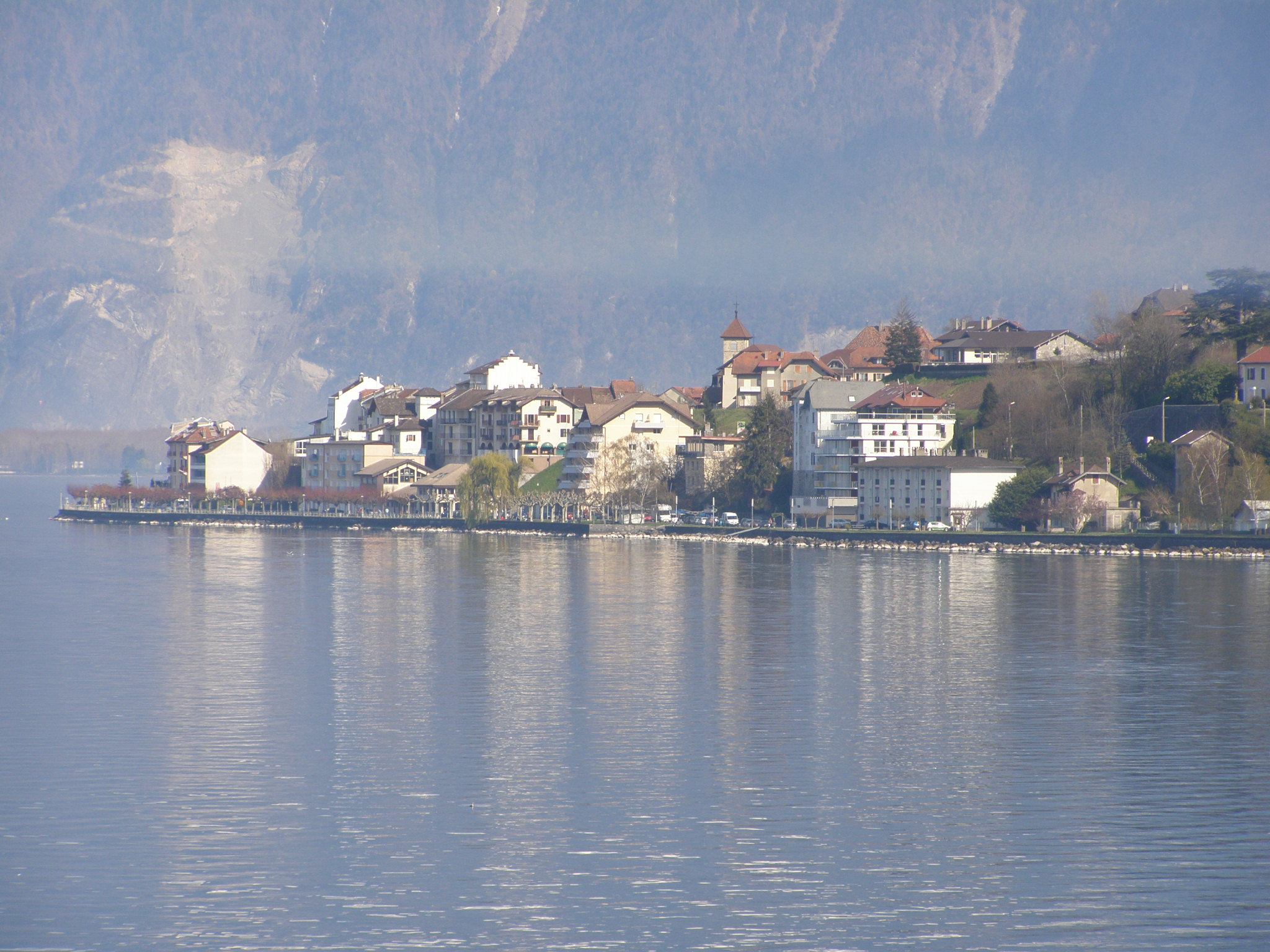
- A view of Saint-Gingolph, arriving from Evian-les-Bains

- Coat of arms
- Location of Saint-Gingolph
- Location within France Location within Auvergne-Rhône-Alpes
- Coordinates: 46°23′00″N 6°40′00″E
- Country: France
- Region: Auvergne-Rhône-Alpes
- Department: Haute-Savoie
- Arrondissement: Thonon-les-Bains
- Canton: Évian-les-Bains
- Intercommunality: Pays d'Évian Vallée d'Abondance

Government
  - Mayor (2020–2026): Géraldine Pflieger
- Area^{1}: 7.33 km^{2} (2.83 sq mi)
- Highest elevation: 1,472 m (4,829 ft)
- Lowest elevation: 376 m (1,234 ft)
- Population (2023): 903
  - Density: 123/km^{2} (319/sq mi)
- Demonym: Gingolais
- Time zone: UTC+01:00 (CET)
  - Summer (DST): UTC+02:00 (CEST)
- INSEE/Postal code: 74237 /74500
- Website: www.st-gingolph.fr
- ^{1} French Land Register data, which excludes lakes, ponds, glaciers > 1 km^{2} (0.386 sq mi or 247 acres) and river estuaries.

Saint-Gingolph (French pronunciation: [sɛ̃ ʒɛ̃ɡɔlf]) is a commune in the Haute-Savoie department in the Auvergne-Rhône-Alpes region in south-eastern France. It lies at the outflow of the river Morge into Lake Geneva. With the adjacent Swiss municipality Saint-Gingolph, it forms one built up area. The Morge forms the border with Switzerland.

== See also ==
- Communes of the Haute-Savoie department
