= Sionne (river) =

River located in Switzerland

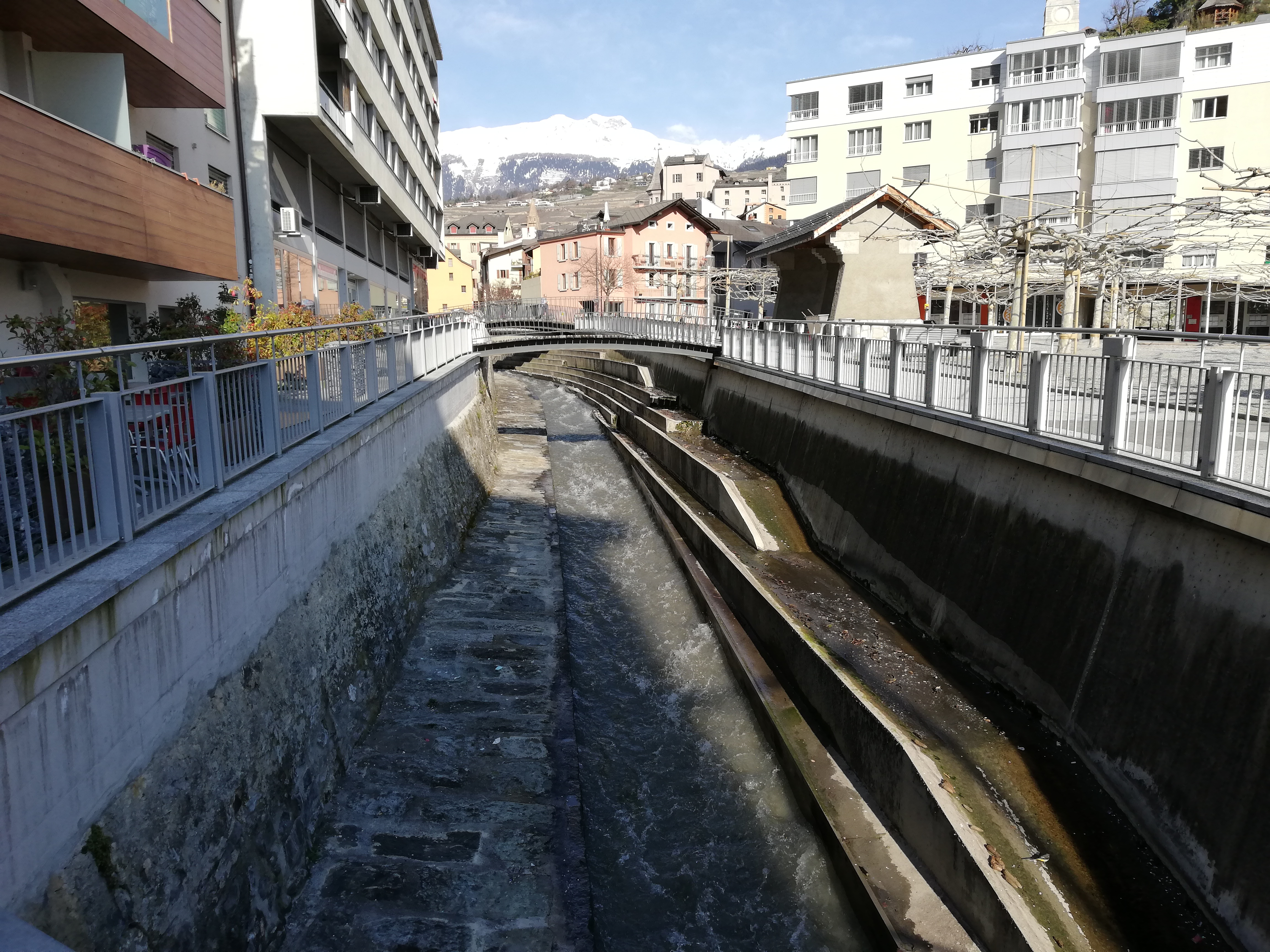
- The Sionne, passing through downtown Sion

Location
- Country: Switzerland

Physical characteristics
- Source: Chamossaire
  - location: west slope
  - elevation: 2,310 m
- Mouth: Rhône
  - location: Sion, Switzerland
  - coordinates: 46°13′44″N 7°22′10″E
  - elevation: 2,208 m
- Length: 11 km (6.8 mi)
- Basin size: 27, 6 km

The Sionne is a Swiss river, and a tributary of the Rhône.

== Course ==
This torrential has a nival regime and is a right-bank tributary of the Rhône. Its source is in the Chamossaire region at an altitude of 2,310 m. It crosses the Savièse and Grimisuat plateaus and, after a course of around 11 km, flows into the Rhône at 490 m, after passing through the town of Sion. Its catchment area is 27.6 km. Its main tributary is the Drahin.

The Swiss Federal Institute carries out avalanche measurements on the right bank.

== Notable floods ==
Following major floods, the Sionne was covered over almost 400 m across the town of Sion in several phases between 1657 and the end of 1740, leading to the creation of the Rue du Grand-Pont. The Sionne has often caused flooding, particularly in the lower reaches of the Valais capital. About twice a century, a catastrophic event is observed, accompanied by severe damage. The last two major floods occurred in November 1944 and July 1992. To prevent further major damage, measures have been taken upstream of Sion and in the town of Sion at the Place des Tanneries. An EPFL study carried out prior to this work determined that a 100-year flood could reach a discharge of 39 m^{3}/s.

On August 6, 2018, a violent thunderstorm caused the river to overflow its banks, with flows reaching 8 m^{3}/s. On July 26, 2019, the previous year's scenario was repeated, albeit with less virulence. The maximum flow rate measured was 6.3 m^{3}/s. Cellars in the town of Sion were still flooded.

From September 2019, Sion will own 440 m of mobile dikes that can be deployed by the fire department.

== See also ==
- List of rivers of Europe
  - List of rivers of Switzerland
- Rhône
- Sion, Switzerland
