= Le Morge =

Coordinates: 42°12′32″N 14°33′30″E

- Frazione
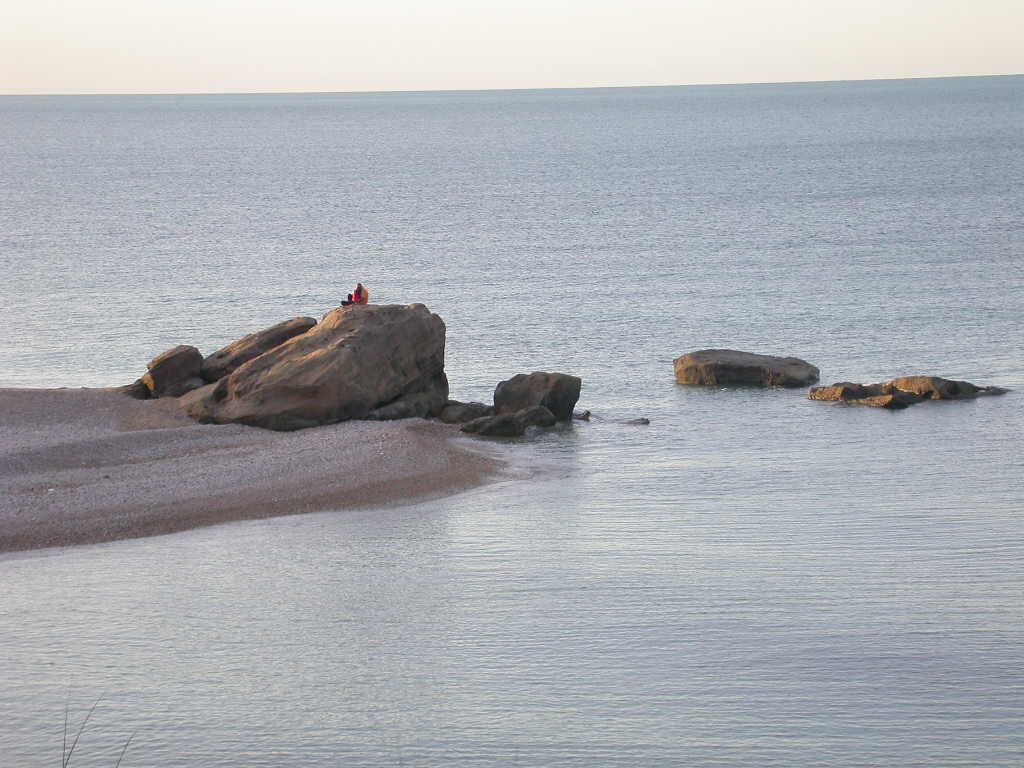
- Interactive map of Le Morge
- Country: Italy
- Region: Abruzzo
- Province: Chieti
- Time zone: UTC+1 (CET)
  - Summer (DST): UTC+2 (CEST)

Le Morge is a frazione (village) on the Adriatic Sea in the Province of Chieti, in the Abruzzo region of eastern Italy.

== Eponym ==
The name Morge is an Abruzzese dialectal deriving from the Latin word "murex" which means stone or rock. The beach is in fact made up of large pebbles; moreover, rocky barriers, even outcropping ones, are present in the stretch of sea in front of this area.

== History ==
The area was frequented since the Italic era, being the area of the ancient Frentani. Under the government of Rome there were nearby stations as evidenced by the Itinerary of Antonino, but also archaeological finds in the coastal area of Casalbordino. The historian Domenico Priori reconstructs the medieval and modern events of the area, a small port of the Osento river, owned by the Benedictine monks of Santo Stefano a Rivomare, a chevera abbey located right near the mouth.
