= Dent du Vélan =

Mountain in Switzerland

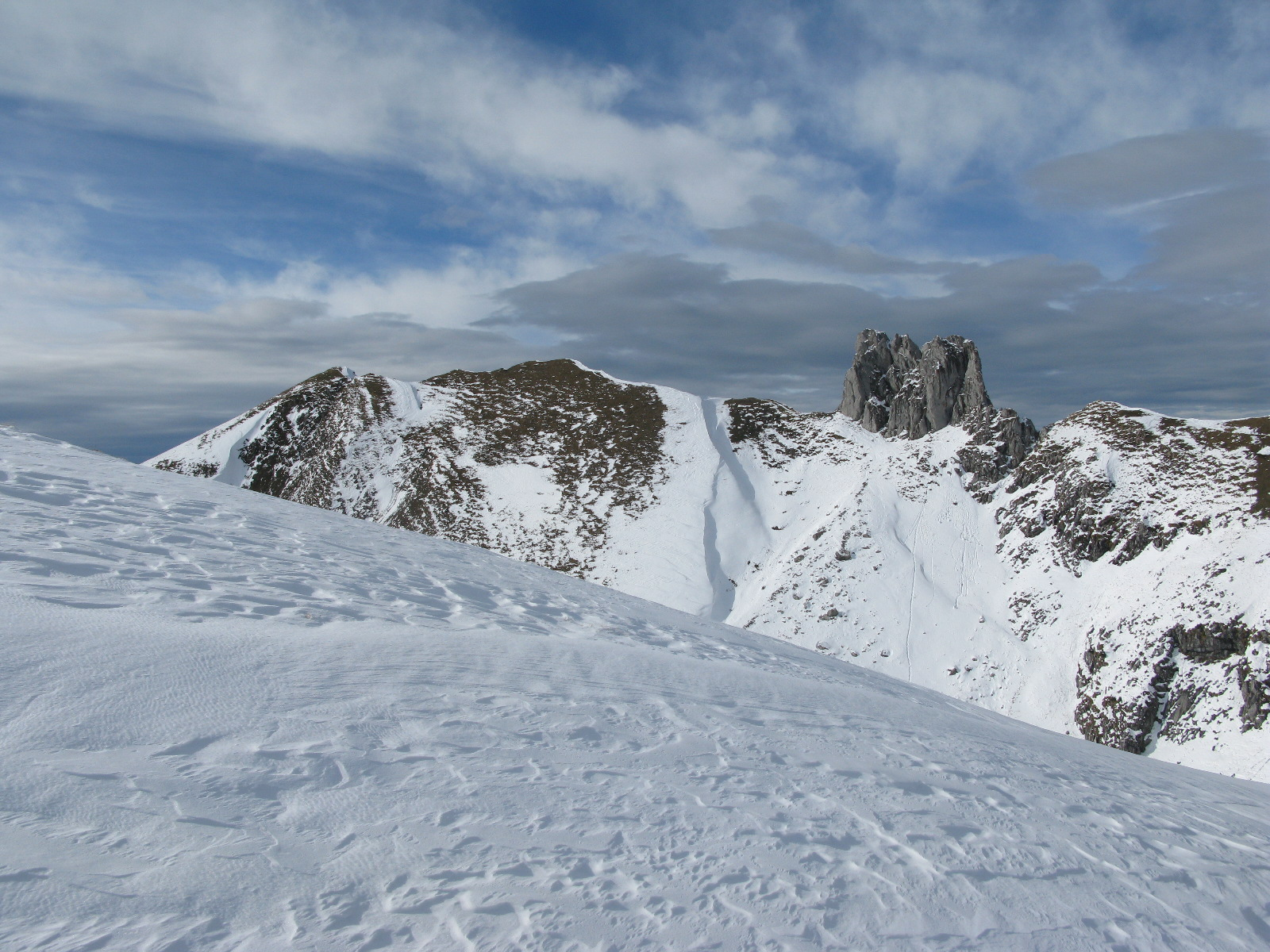

Highest point
- Elevation: 2,059 m (6,755 ft)
- Coordinates: 46°20′49.6″N 6°46′29.3″E

Geography
- Location within Alps
- Main peaks in Chablais Alps Mouse over (or touch) gives more detail of peaks. Location in the Alps
- Location: Haute-Savoie, France; Valais, Switzerland
- Parent range: Chablais Alps

The Dent du Vélan is a peak in the Chablais Alps, located north of the Cornettes de Bise. At 2,059 metres (6,755 ft) above sea level, its summit straddles the border between Switzerland and France. The Dent du Vélan is the westernmost summit rising above 2,000 m (6,560 ft) in Switzerland.
