= Morge (Lake Geneva) =

River in Switzerland

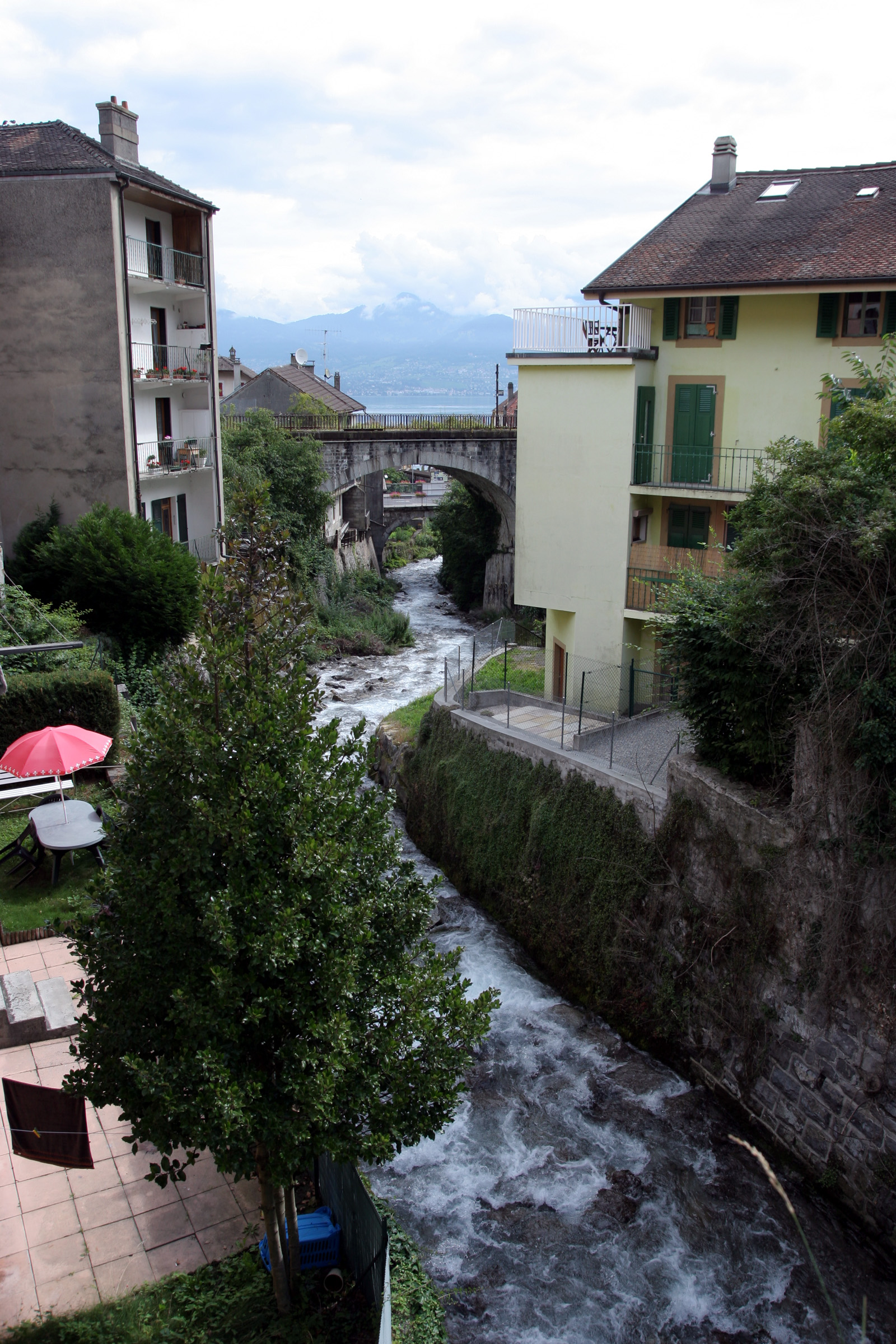
- The mountain creek Morge forms the border in Saint Gingolph. Left site is French, right site is Swiss.
- Native name: La Morge (French)

Location
- Countries: France, Switzerland
- Regions: Haute-Savoie, Valais

Physical characteristics
- Source: North side of the Dent du Vélan
  - location: France / Switzerland
  - coordinates: 46.34988°N 6.77228°E
  - elevation: 2,700 m (8,900 ft)
- Mouth: Lake Geneva
  - location: Saint-Gingolph
  - coordinates: 46.39419°N 6.80524°E
  - elevation: 372 m (1,220 ft)
- Length: 7.88 km (4.90 mi)
- Basin size: 19.7 km^{2} (7.6 sq mi)

Basin features
- Progression: Lake Geneva→ Rhône→ Mediterranean Sea

The Morge, also called Morge de Saint-Gingolph, is a river in the Alps. Its course marks the border between France and Switzerland, between the canton of Valais and Haute-Savoie, southeast of Lake Geneva.

== Geography ==
With a length of 7.88 km (4.90 mi), the Morge has its source on the northern side of the Dent du Vélan, in the French municipality of Bernex and then flows north through the Morge valley, passes near Novel and then flows into Lake Geneva at Saint-Gingolph.

The Morge stream was recognized as the boundary between Savoyard or Lower Valais and episcopal or Upper Valais since 1384, and the Treaty of Thonon of March 4, 1569 sets the border between Savoy and Valais in La Morge.

== Name ==
The "Morge" is a hydronym derived from a Celtic root *morg, itself a metathesis of *mrog, from the Indo-European root *mer[e]g-, designating a "border, demarcation, limit". In Latin, it will give the form margo, margins, also designating a "edge, border, border boundary, bank". The river shares this origin with the Morge de Conthey and the Morges Vaudoise; it is sometimes called "Morge de Saint-Gingolph" to avoid confusion with that of Conthey.

The river seems to be mentioned in the form Morgia in the 12th and 13th centuries.
