= Schaffhausen =

- Municipality
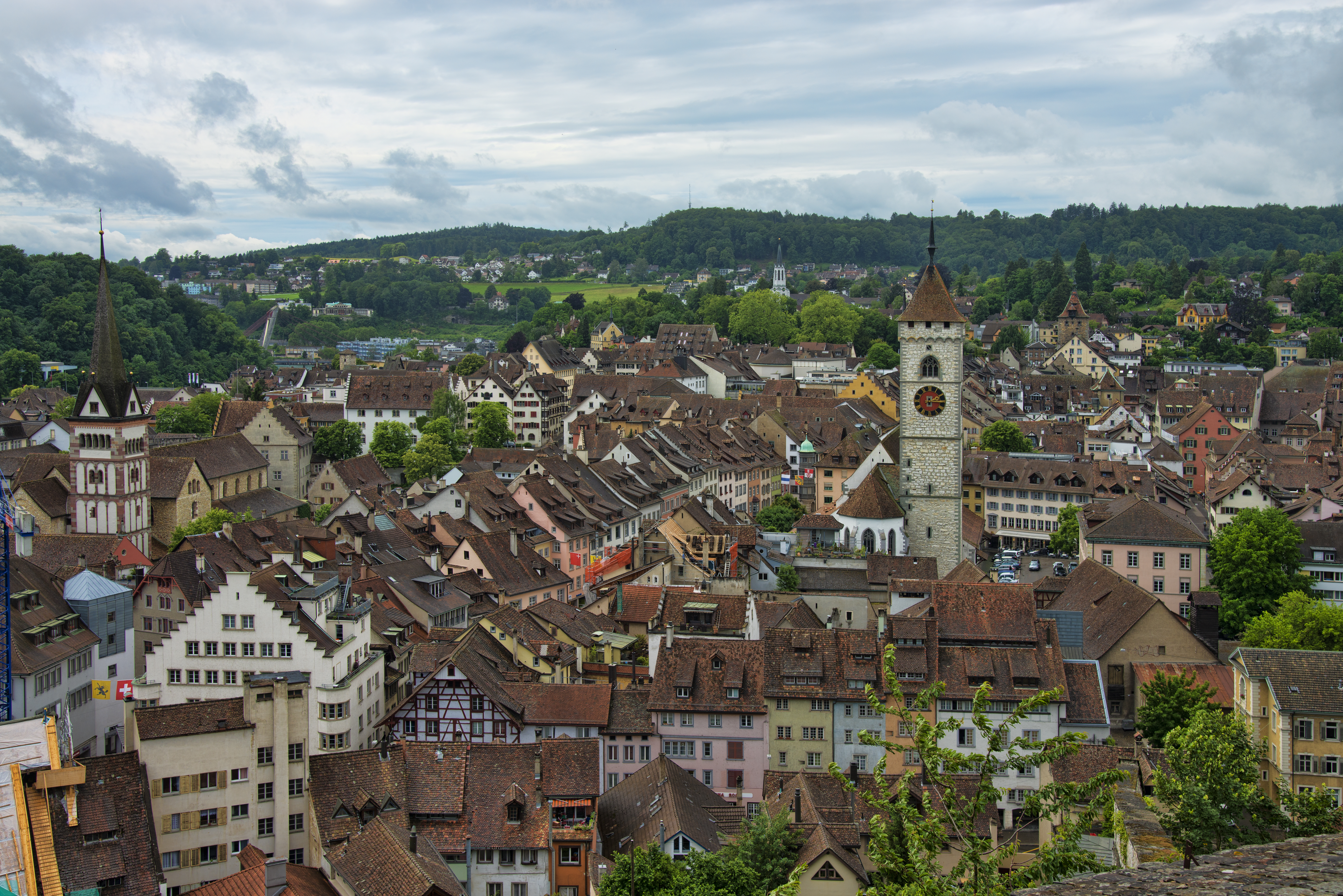
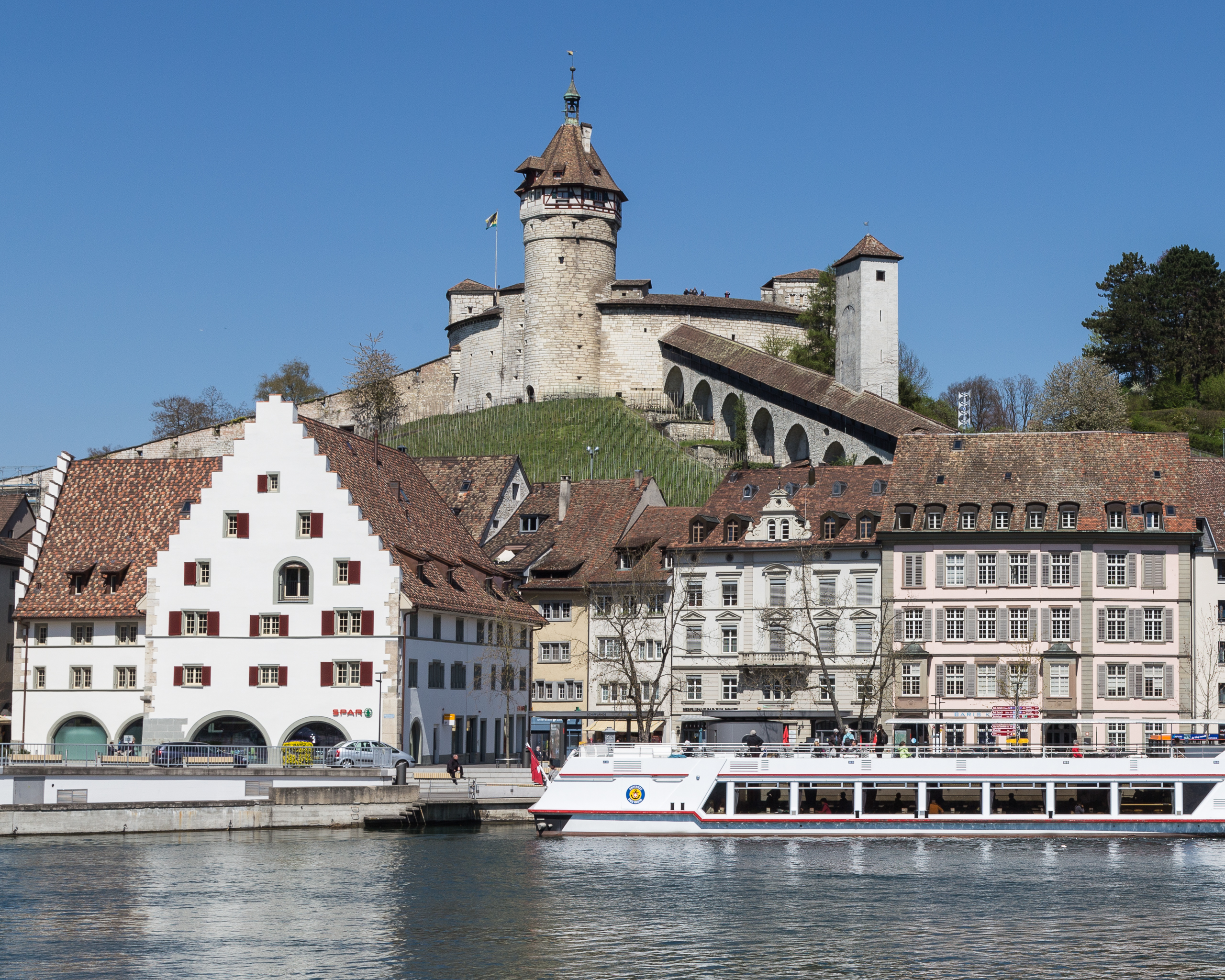
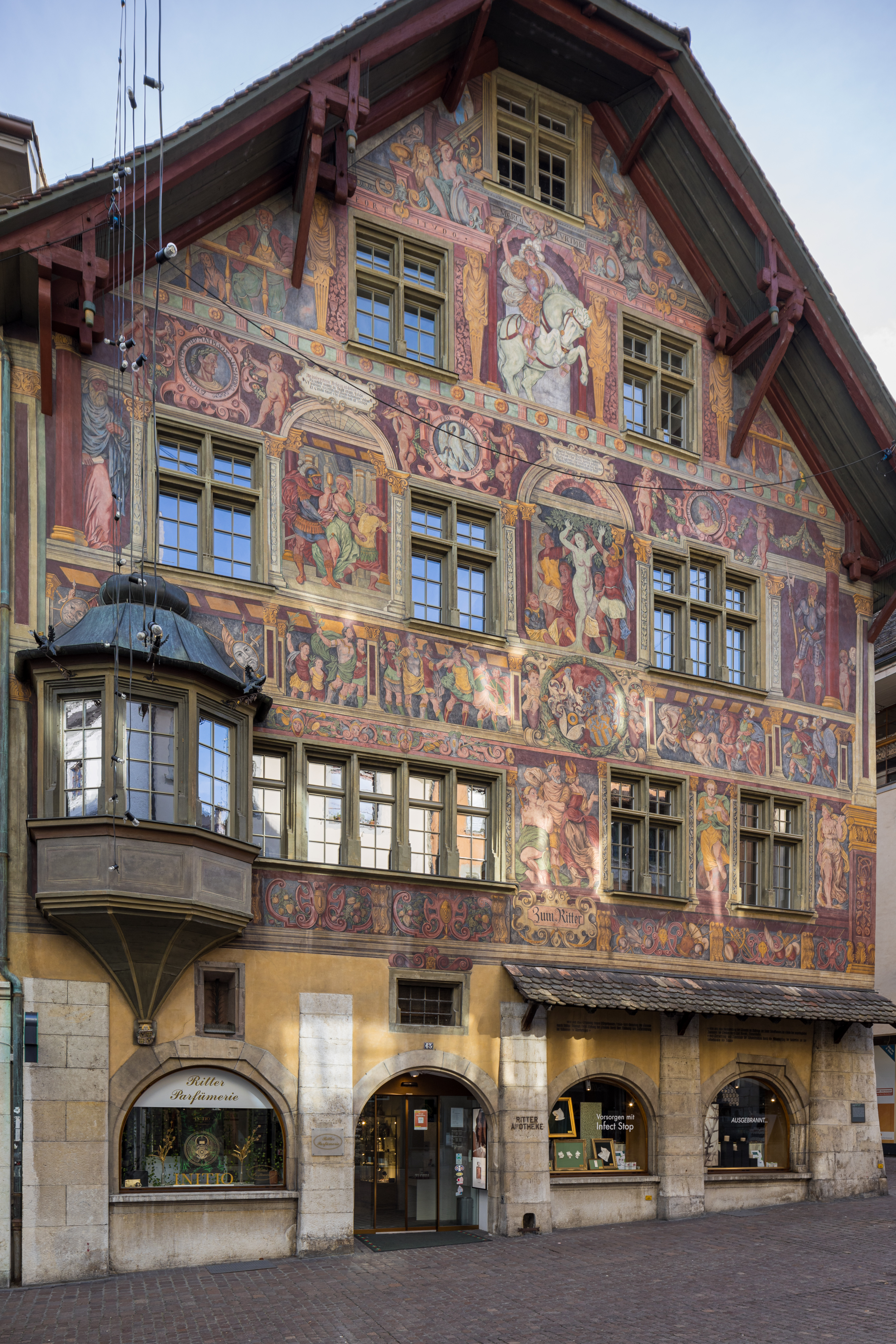
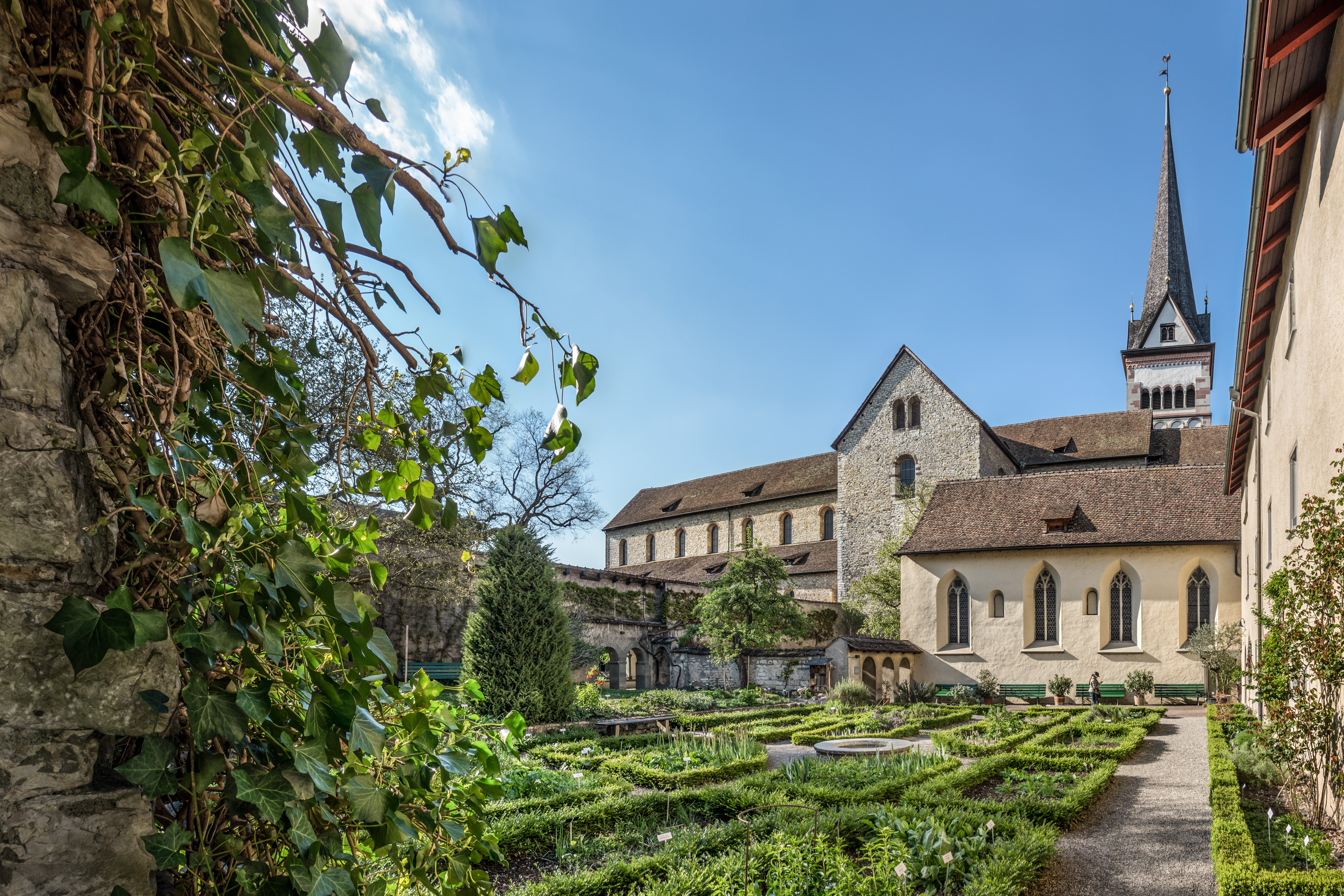
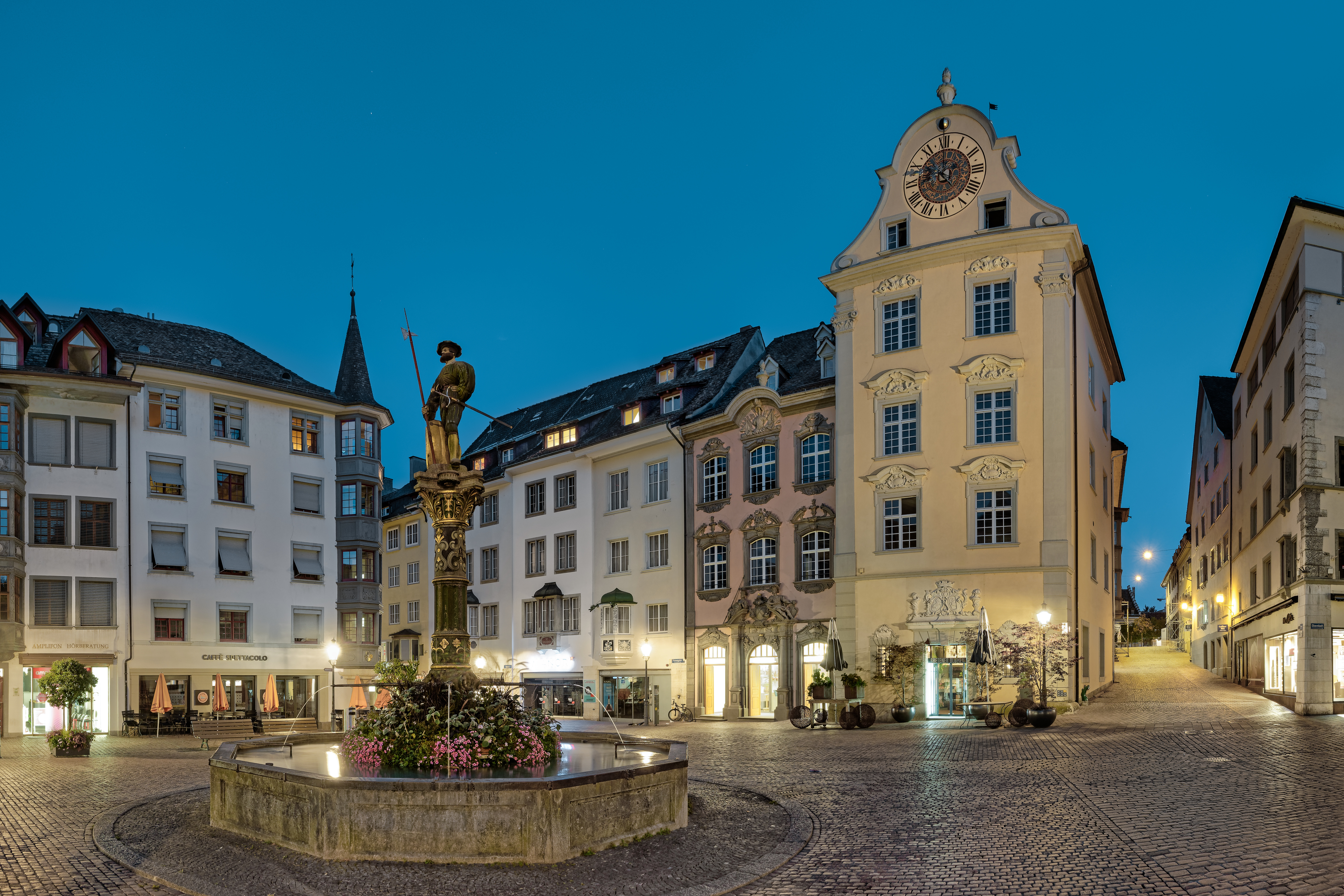
- Clockwise from top: Old town, frescoed building Haus zum Ritter, Fronwagplatz, Münster and herb garden, Munot fortress and Rhine river

- Flag Coat of arms
- Location of Schaffhausen
- Location within Switzerland Location within Canton of Schaffhausen
- Coordinates: 47°42′N 8°38′E
- Country: Switzerland
- Canton: Schaffhausen
- District: (None in canton of Schaffhausen)

Government
  - Executive: Stadtrat with 5 members
  - Mayor: Stadtpräsident (list); Peter Neukomm SPS/PSS (as of December 2025)
  - Parliament: Grosser Stadtrat with 36 members

Area
  - Total: 41.85 km^{2} (16.16 sq mi)
- Elevation (Bahnhofstrasse): 403 m (1,322 ft)

Population (31 December 2018)
  - Total: 36,952
  - Density: 883.0/km^{2} (2,287/sq mi)
- Time zone: UTC+01:00 (CET)
  - Summer (DST): UTC+02:00 (CEST)
- Postal code: 8200, 8203, 8207, 8208, 8231 Hemmental
- SFOS number: 2939
- ISO 3166 code: CH-SH
- Localities: Schaffhausen, Breite, Gruben, Buchthalen, St. Niklausen, Herblingen, Hauental, Hemmental
- Surrounded by: Beringen, Büsingen am Hochrhein (DE-BW), Büttenhardt, Dörflingen, Feuerthalen (ZH), Flurlingen (ZH), Merishausen, Neuhausen am Rheinfall, Stetten, Thayngen
- Twin towns: Sindelfingen (Germany), Singen am Hohentwiel (Germany), Dobrich (Bulgaria)
- Website: www.stadt-schaffhausen.ch

Schaffhausen (Swiss Standard German: [ʃafˈhaʊzn̩]; Alemannic German: Schafuuse), historically known in English as Shaffhouse, (Note: /ʃæˈfuːz/ shaf-OOZ, French: [ʃafuz]; Italian: Sciaffusa; Romansh: Schaffusa.) is a town with historic roots, a municipality in northern Switzerland, and the capital of the canton of the same name; it has an estimated population of 37,000 as of December 2018. It is located on the shore of the High Rhine; it is one of four Swiss towns located entirely on the northern side of the Rhine, along with Neuhausen am Rheinfall, the historic Neunkirch, and medieval Stein am Rhein.

The largely pedestrianised old town has two preserved medieval gate towers and many fine Renaissance era buildings decorated with exterior frescos, sculptures and a total of 171 oriel windows (more than any other Swiss town). The old canton fortress, the Munot, overlooks the old town. Schaffhausen railway station is a junction of Swiss and German railway lines. One of the lines connects the town with the nearby Rhine Falls in Neuhausen am Rheinfall, Europe's largest waterfall and a popular tourist attraction.

== Name ==
The town is first mentioned in 1045 as Villa Scafhusun. There are at least two theories on the origin of this name:

- One relates to a mention of a "ford" across the Rhine that first occurs in 1050. This "ford" may actually refer to a scapha or skiff which was used to disembark goods coming from Constance to move them around the Rhine Falls. The name Scafhusun then arose from the scapha used at that point.
- Another theory is that Scafhusun comes from Schaf (a sheep), as a ram (now a sheep) formed the ancient arms (traceable to 1049) of the town, derived from those of its founders, the counts of Nellenburg.

=== Coat of arms ===
The blazon of the municipal coat of arms is Or on a Base Vert issuant from sinister a Semi Castle Argent with tower with entrance from which is issuing a Semi Ram Sable. The canting coat of arms refers to the second interpretation of the name, sheep-house.

== History ==
Aerial view by Walter Mittelholzer (1919)

Schweizersbild, now located in a residential area, is a rock shelter, which during the Paleolithic period was the site of a habitation. Several artifacts were unearthed during archeological excavations, which are on display at the Museum zu Allerheiligen, among others.

Schaffhausen was a city state in the Middle Ages, documented to have struck its own coins from 1045. About 1050 the counts of Nellenburg founded the Benedictine monastery of All Saints, which became the centre of the town. Perhaps as early as 1190, certainly in 1208, it was an imperial free city, while the first seal dates from 1253. The powers of the abbot were gradually limited and in 1277 the Emperor Rudolf I gave the town a charter of liberties. In 1330 the emperor Louis of Bavaria pledged it to the Habsburgs. In the early 15th century, Habsburg power over the city waned. In 1349 and 1401 (Schaffhausen Massacre), two pogroms occurred in the city. By 1411 the guilds ruled the city. Then, in 1415 the Habsburg Duke Frederick IV of Austria sided with the Antipope John XXIII at the Council of Constance, and was banned by the Emperor Sigismund. As a result of the ban and Frederick's need of money, Schaffhausen was able to buy its independence from the Habsburgs in 1418. The city allied with six of the Swiss confederates in 1454 and allied with a further two (Uri and Unterwalden) in 1479. Schaffhausen became a full member of the Old Swiss Confederacy in 1501.

The Reformation was adopted, initially, in 1524 and completely in 1529. The town was heavily damaged during the Thirty Years' War by the passage of Swedish (Protestant) and Bavarian (Roman Catholic) troops and the very important bridge was burnt down. It was not until the early 19th century that the arrested industrial development of the town recommenced. In 1857, the first railroad, the Rheinfallbahn, running from Winterthur, reached Schaffhausen.

Schaffhausen is located in a finger of Swiss territory surrounded on three sides by Germany. On 1 April 1944, Schaffhausen suffered a bombing raid by aircraft of the United States Army Air Forces, which strayed from German airspace into neutral Switzerland due to navigation errors. Air raid sirens had often sounded in the past, without an actual attack, so many residents ignored the sirens that day. A total of 40 civilians were killed in the raid. President Franklin Delano Roosevelt sent a personal letter of apology to the mayor of Schaffhausen and the United States quickly offered four million US dollars in reparations.

== Geography and climate ==
=== Topography ===
The town of Schaffhausen stands on the right bank of the river Rhine. It has an area, (as of the 2004/09 survey) of 41.85 km^{2} (16.16 sq mi). Of this area, about 20.2% is used for agricultural purposes, while 53.4% is forested. Of the rest of the land, 24.8% is settled (buildings or roads) and 1.6% is unproductive land. Over the past two decades (1979/85-2004/09) the amount of land that is settled has increased by 95 ha (230 acres) and the agricultural land has decreased by 117 ha (290 acres).

In 1947 it merged with the former municipality of Buchthalen. Its area expanded again in 1964 when Herblingen was absorbed and for a third time in 2009 when Hemmental joined the municipality.

Schaffhausen shares an international border with the German village of Büsingen am Hochrhein, an enclave entirely surrounded by Switzerland.

=== Climate ===
Schaffhausen has an average of 122.5 days of rain or snow per year and on average receives 907 mm (35.7 in) of precipitation. The wettest month is July during which time Schaffhausen receives an average of 95 mm (3.7 in) of rain. During this month there is precipitation for an average of 11.3 days. The driest month of the year is February with an average of 59 mm (2.3 in) of precipitation over 8.4 days.

Climate data for Schaffhausen, elevation 438 m (1,437 ft), (1991–2020)
Month	Jan	Feb	Mar	Apr	May	Jun	Jul	Aug	Sep	Oct	Nov	Dec	Year
Mean daily maximum °C (°F)	3.3 (37.9)	5.4 (41.7)	10.7 (51.3)	15.4 (59.7)	19.5 (67.1)	23.1 (73.6)	25.1 (77.2)	24.6 (76.3)	19.7 (67.5)	14.0 (57.2)	7.5 (45.5)	3.8 (38.8)	14.3 (57.7)
Daily mean °C (°F)	0.7 (33.3)	1.7 (35.1)	5.8 (42.4)	9.9 (49.8)	14.0 (57.2)	17.6 (63.7)	19.3 (66.7)	18.8 (65.8)	14.5 (58.1)	9.8 (49.6)	4.7 (40.5)	1.5 (34.7)	9.9 (49.8)
Mean daily minimum °C (°F)	−1.7 (28.9)	−1.6 (29.1)	1.5 (34.7)	4.7 (40.5)	8.9 (48.0)	12.4 (54.3)	14.1 (57.4)	13.9 (57.0)	10.2 (50.4)	6.4 (43.5)	2.1 (35.8)	−0.9 (30.4)	5.8 (42.4)
Average precipitation mm (inches)	72.4 (2.85)	59.8 (2.35)	64.1 (2.52)	67.8 (2.67)	100.3 (3.95)	95.4 (3.76)	103.4 (4.07)	95.3 (3.75)	71.8 (2.83)	76.7 (3.02)	72.7 (2.86)	86.0 (3.39)	965.7 (38.02)
Average snowfall cm (inches)	17.6 (6.9)	17.1 (6.7)	5.6 (2.2)	0.8 (0.3)	0.0 (0.0)	0.0 (0.0)	0.0 (0.0)	0.0 (0.0)	0.0 (0.0)	0.0 (0.0)	5.1 (2.0)	11.0 (4.3)	57.2 (22.5)
Average precipitation days (≥ 1.0 mm)	10.2	8.7	10.0	9.4	11.3	10.9	11.4	10.8	8.9	10.5	9.9	11.1	123.1
Average snowy days (≥ 1.0 cm)	5.1	5.3	2.2	3.6	0.6	0.0	0.0	0.0	0.0	0.0	1.7	4.2	19.0
Average relative humidity (%)	84	79	72	66	69	69	69	72	78	84	86	86	76
Mean monthly sunshine hours	42.1	76.2	130.0	164.7	181.6	204.3	221.3	204.7	151.0	88.1	42.8	32.8	1,539.6
Percentage possible sunshine	19	31	42	46	46	50	54	55	47	31	18	16	41
Source 1: NOAA
Source 2: MeteoSchweiz (snow 1981–2010)

== Politics ==
=== Government ===
The City Council (de: Stadtrat) constitutes the executive government of the town of Schaffhausen and operates as a collegiate authority. It is composed of five councilors (German: Stadtrat/Stadträtin), each presiding over a department (Referat), which each consists of several administrative districts. The president of the executive department acts as mayor (Stadtpräsident(in)). In the mandate period January 2025 – December 2028 (Amtsdauer) the City Council is presided by Stadtpräsident Peter Neukomm. Departmental tasks, coordination measures and implementation of laws decreed by the Grand City Council (parliament) are carried by the City Council. The regular election of the City Council by any inhabitant valid to vote is held every four years. Any resident of Schaffhausen allowed to vote can be elected as a member of the City Council. The mayor is elected as such as well by public election while the heads of the other directorates are assigned by the collegiate. The mayor as well as the delegates are elected by means of a system of Majorz.

As of 2025, Schaffhausen's City Council is made up of two representative of the SP (Social Democratic Party), of who one is also the mayor, one of the FDP (The Liberals), one of the SVP (Swiss People's Party), one of the GLP (Green Liberal Party), and one independent. The last regular election was held on 18 August 2024.

Stadtrat of Schaffhausen 2025-2028
City Councillor (Stadtrat/ Stadträtin)	Party	Title	Head of department (Referat, since) of	elected since
Peter Neukomm	SP	Stadtpräsident (Mayor)	Mayor's Office (Präsidialreferat, 2017)	2012
Marco Planas	independent	Bildungsreferent	Education (Bildungsreferat, 2025)	2024
Daniel Preisig	independent (until 2025: SVP)	Finanzreferent (Vice President)	Finances (Finanzreferat, 2017)	2016
Katrin Bernath	GLP	Baureferentin	Construction and Civil Engineering (Baureferat, 2017)	2016
Christine Thommen	SP	Sozial- und Sicherheitsreferent	Social Services and Security (Sozial- und Sicherheitsreferat, 2020)	2020

Yvonne Waldvogel is the town chronicler (German: Stadtschreiberin) since 2018.

Mayor (Stadtpräsident) of Schaffhausen
Term	Mayor	Lifespan	Party	Notes
1831–1835	Johann Conrad Fischer	(1773–1854)		
1835–1844	Johann Heinrich Im Thurn	(1777–1845)		
1845–1851	Tobias Hurter	(1790–1866)		
1851–1865	Hans von Ziegler	(1810–1865)		
1866–1867	Johann Heinrich Ammann	(1820–1867)		
1867–1879	Georg Rauschenbach	(1816–1879)		
1879–1891	Rudolf Pfister	(1824–1893)		
1891–1893	Conrad Habicht-Oechslin	(1842–1931)		
1893–1894	Ernst Müller-Fink	(1851–1910)		
1894–1917	Carl Spahn	(1863–1943)		
1917–1919	Hermann Schlatter	(1873–1953)		
1919–1932	Heinrich Pletscher	(1878–1952)		
1933–1968	Walther Bringolf	(1895–1981)	SPS/PSS	
1969–1988	Felix Schwank	(born 1922)	FDP/PRD	
1989–1996	Max Hess	(born 1944)	SPS/PSS	
1997–2008	Marcel Wenger	(born 1948)	FDP/PRD	
2009–2014	Thomas Feurer	(born 1953)	ÖBS	
2015–present	Peter Neukomm	(born 1962)	SPS	

=== Parliament ===
The Grosse Stadtrat of Schaffhausen for the mandate period of 2025–2028
1. JUSO (2.80%)
2. SP (27.8%)
3. JG (2.80%)
4. Green (5.60%)
5. glp (11.1%)
6. EVP (2.80%)
7. The Centre (2.80%)
8. FDP (16.7%)
9. SVP (22.2%)
10. EDU (2.80%)
11. PUSH (2.80%)

The Grand City Council (Grosser Stadtrat) holds legislative power. It is made up of 36 members, with elections held every four years. The Grand City Council decrees regulations and by-laws that are executed by the City Council and the administration. The delegates are selected by means of a system of Proporz.

The sessions of the Grand City Council are public. Unlike members of the City Council, members of the Grand City Council are not politicians by profession, and they are paid a fee based on their attendance. Any resident of Schaffhausen allowed to vote can be elected as a member of the Grand City Council. The parliament holds its meetings in the Kantonsratsaal (Cantonal Council Hall) on Kornmarkt.

The last regular election of the Grand City Council was held on 24 November 2024 for the mandate period (German: Legislatur) from January 2025 to December 2028. Currently the Grand City Council consist of 10 members of the Social Democratic Party (SP/PS) and one of its junior section, the JUSO, 8 of the Swiss People's Party (SVP/UDC), 6 of The Liberals (FDP/PLR) and none of its junior partner, the JFSH, 4 of the Green Liberal Party (GLP/PVL), 2 of the Green Party (GPS/PES)) and one of its junior partner, the Junge Grüne, and one each of The Centre (former CVP/PDC), Evangelical People's Party (EVP/PES), Federal Democratic Union (EDU/UDF), and one of the PUSH.

=== National elections ===
National Council

In the 2023 federal election the most popular party was the SP (35.9%, +3.8). The next five most popular parties were the SVP with 29.7% of the vote (-3.1), the FDP (12.7%, +3.1), the GLP with 7.4% (+0.8), the Greens with 6.3% (-1.7), and others (8.0%). In the federal election, a total of 14,450 votes were cast, and the voter turnout was 60.9% (+2.2).

In the 2019 federal election the most popular party was the SVP with 32.8% of the vote (-6.2). The next five most popular parties were the SP (32.1%, -1.9), the FDP (9.6%, -3.1), the Greens with 8.0% (+3.7), the GLP with 6.6% (+6.6), and others (10.9%). In the federal election, a total of 13,351 votes were cast, and the voter turnout was 57.7% (-3.0).

In the 2015 federal election the most popular party was the SVP with 39.0% of the vote (+7.2). The next three most popular parties were the SP (34.0%, -7.6), the FDP (12.7%, +0.6), the Greens with 4.3% (+4.3), and others (10.0%). In the federal election, a total of 13,754 votes were cast, and the voter turnout was 60.7% (+2.8).

== Demographics ==
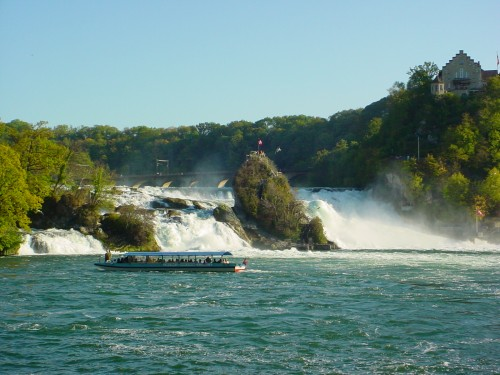
Rhine Falls as seen from Neuhausen am Rheinfall

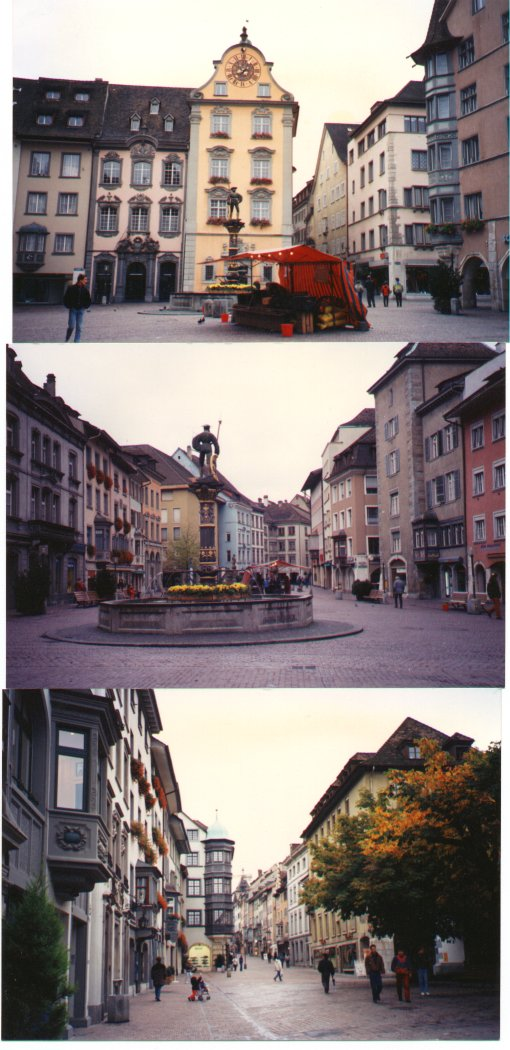
Views of old town, Schaffhausen

=== Population ===
Schaffhausen has a population (as of December 2020) of 36,952. As of 2014, 27.9% of the population are resident foreign nationals. Of the foreign population, (as of 2008), 21% are from Germany, 13.3% are from Italy, 8.8% are from Croatia, 13.3% are from Serbia, 6% are from North Macedonia, 9% are from Turkey, and 28.6% are from other countries. Most of the population (as of 2000) speaks German (84.3%), with Serbo-Croatian being second most common (3.4%) and Italian being third (3.2%).

Over the last four years (2010–2014) the population has changed at a rate of 2.82%. The birth rate in the municipality, in 2014, was 9.6, while the death rate was 10.1 per thousand residents.

As of 2014, children and teenagers (0–19 years old) make up 17.8% of the population, while adults (20–64 years old) are 61.7% and seniors (over 64 years old) make up 20.5%. In 2015 there were 15,288 single residents, 15,287 people who were married or in a civil partnership, 2,119 widows or widowers, 3,253 divorced residents and 1 people who did not answer the question.

In 2014 there were 16,723 private households in Schaffhausen with an average household size of 2.10 persons. Of the 5,863 inhabited buildings in the municipality, in 2000, about 51.5% were single family homes and 29.7% were multiple family buildings. Additionally, about 22.1% of the buildings were built before 1919, while 7.6% were built between 1991 and 2000. In 2013 the rate of construction of new housing units per 1000 residents was 1.29. The vacancy rate for the municipality, in 2015, was 0.71%.

Historic population

The historical population is given in the following chart:

=== Religion ===
As of 2000, 27.4% of the population belonged to the Roman Catholic Church and 43.6% belonged to the Swiss Reformed Church, later organized in the parish St. Johann – Münster.

=== Education ===
In Schaffhausen about 69.8% of the population (between age 25–64) have completed either non-mandatory upper secondary education or additional higher education (either university or a Fachhochschule (university of applied sciences)). In Schaffhausen, as of 2007, 1.73% of the population attend kindergarten or another pre-school, 5.65% attend a Primary School, 2.98% attend a lower level Secondary School, and 2.49% attend a higher level Secondary School.

=== Economy ===
As of 2013, there were a total of 25,749 people employed in the municipality. Of these, a total of 103 people worked in 24 businesses in the primary economic sector. A majority (61.2%) of the primary sector employees worked in very small businesses (less than ten employees). The remainder worked in 2 small businesses with a total of 40 employees. The secondary sector employed 6,403 workers in 371 separate businesses. In 2014 a total of 2,433 employees worked in 358 small companies (less than 50 employees). There were 13 mid sized businesses with 1,631 employees and 3 large businesses which employed 2,333 people (for an average size of 777.7). Finally, the tertiary sector provided 19,243 jobs in 2,626 businesses. In 2014 the tertiary sector numbers had increased by 606 and 20 respectively. In 2014 a total of 12,890 employees worked in 2,597 small companies (less than 50 employees). There were 45 mid sized businesses with 4,938 employees and 4 large businesses which employed 2,021 people (for an average size of 505.3).

In 2014 a total of 1.3% of the population received social assistance.

In 2015 local hotels had a total of 102,537 overnight stays, of which 52.6% were international visitors. In 2015 there were two movie theaters in the municipality, with a total of 10 screens and a total of 1,816 available seats. As of 2008, there are 102 restaurants, and 11 hotels with 445 beds. The catering industry in Schaffhausen employs 924 people.

As of 2008 the mid year average unemployment rate was 2.5%. There were 1,879 non-agrarian businesses in the municipality and 29.9% of the (non-agrarian) population was involved in the secondary sector of the economy while 70.1% were involved in the third. At the same time, 67.1% of the working population was employed full-time, and 32.9% was employed part-time. There were 21,841 residents of the municipality who were employed in some capacity, of which women made up 46.6% of the workforce. As of 2000 there were 10,019 residents who worked in the municipality, while 5,724 residents worked outside Schaffhausen and 8,026 people commuted into the municipality for work.

Schaffhausen has an unemployment rate, as of 2007, of 2.67%. As of 2005, there were 196 people employed in the primary economic sector and about 33 businesses involved in this sector. 6,488 people are employed in the secondary sector and there are 293 businesses in this sector. 14,019 people are employed in the tertiary sector, with 1,486 businesses in this sector.

== Transportation ==
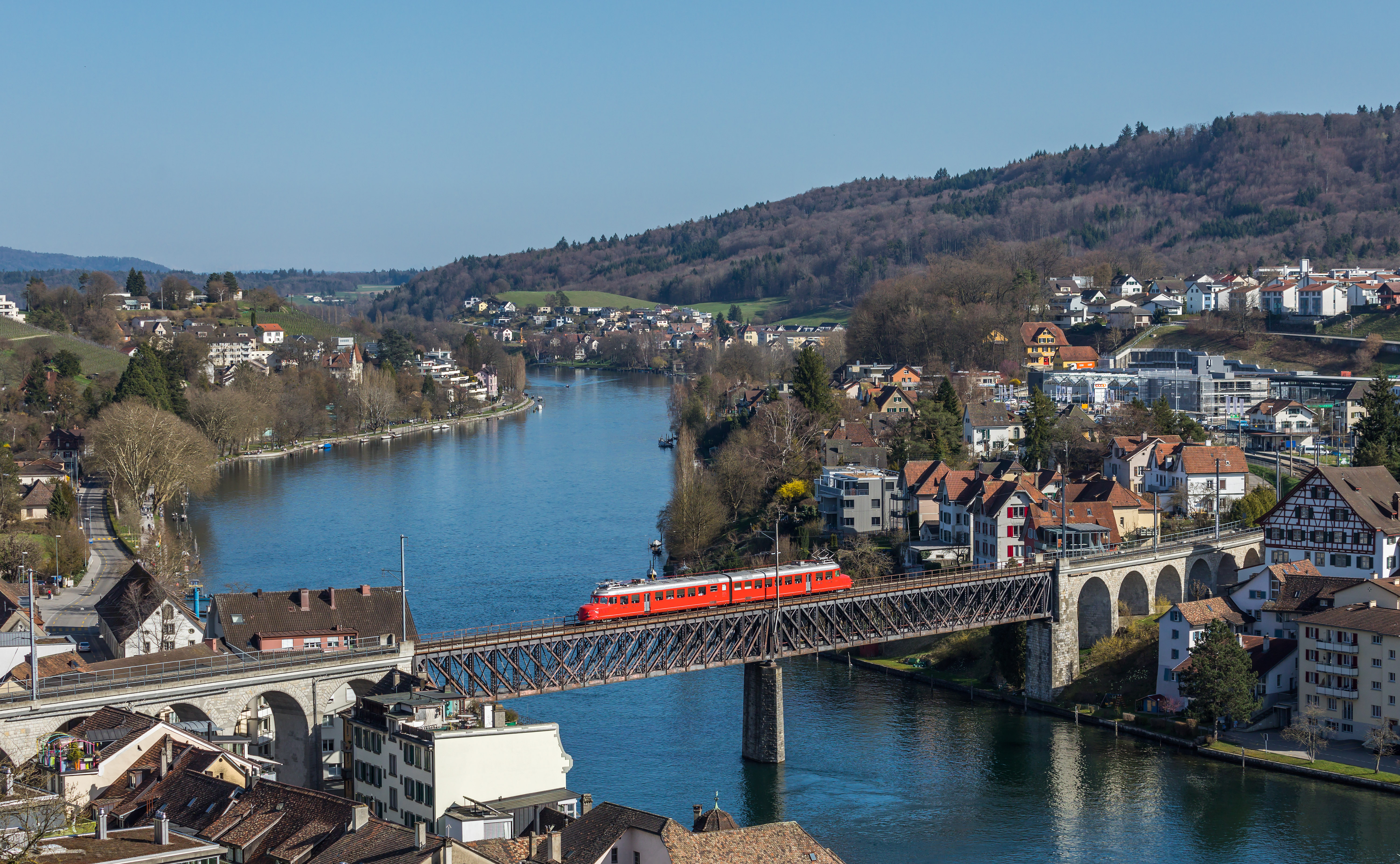
Looking upwards (eastwards), an SBB Red Arrow double railcar crossing the Feuerthalen Rhine bridge; Schaffhausen is on the left and Feuerthalen on the right; picture taken in April 2018 from the Munot castle

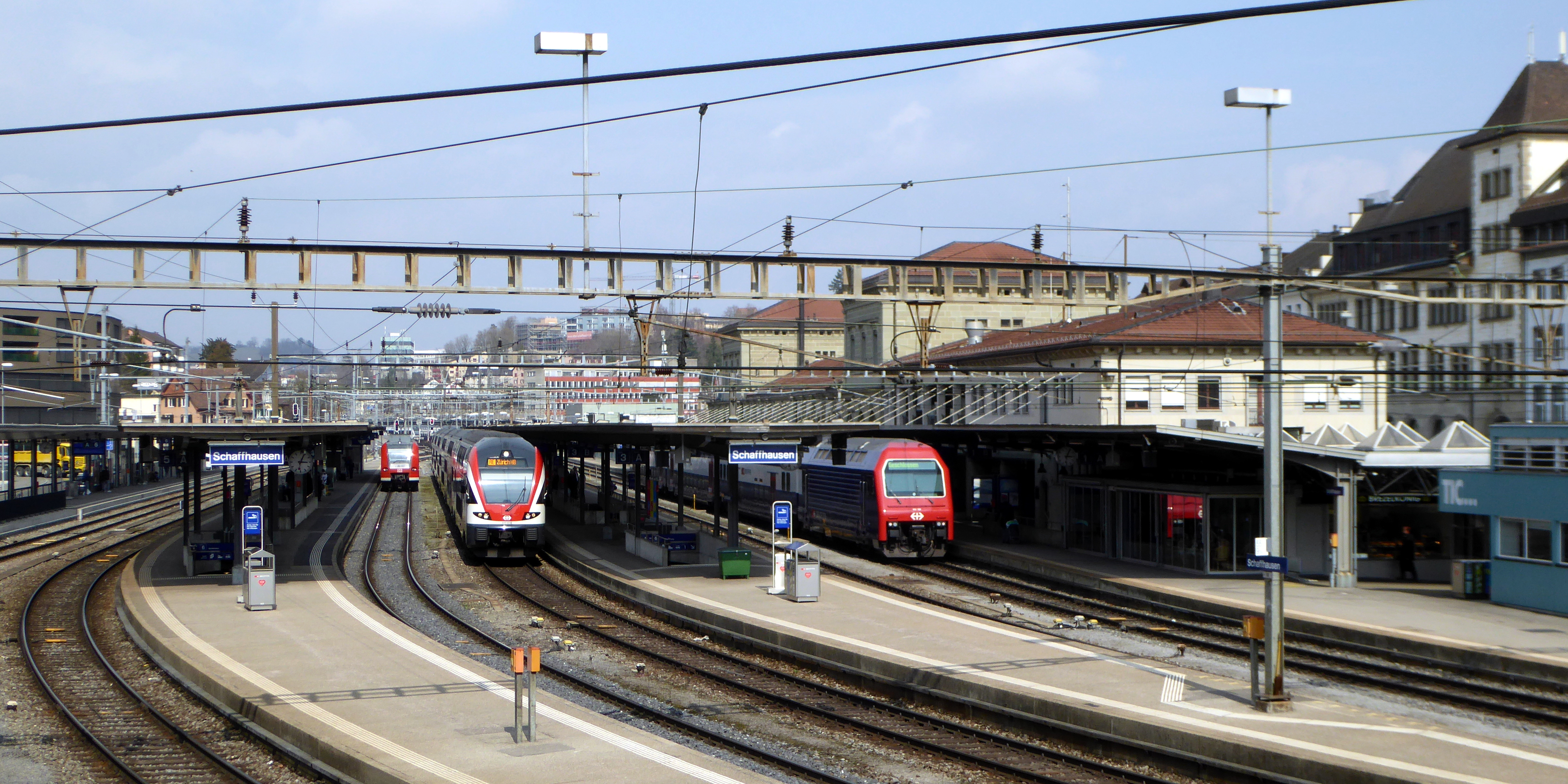
Trains waiting at Schaffhausen railway station

=== Train ===
The town of Schaffhausen is served by two railway stations, Schaffhausen railway station and Herblingen railway station.

Schaffhausen railway station is jointly owned by the Swiss Federal Railways (SBB) and Deutsche Bahn (DB), and is served by trains of both nation's networks. The station is served by long-distance passenger trains (InterCity, IC) running between Stuttgart and Zürich, RegioExpress (RE) trains between Zürich HB and Schaffhausen, and Interregio-Express (IRE) trains between Basel and Friedrichshafen. Trains of Zürich S-Bahn services S9, S12, S24 and S33 serve the station, although only the S24 provides a direct service to Zürich Airport and Zürich main station. In addition, the S1 service of St. Gallen S-Bahn operates over the Lake Line to St. Gallen and Wil. The S64 and S65 services of Schaffhausen S-Bahn link Schaffhausen with Erzingen and Jestetten, respectively.

Herblingen railway station in the north-east of Schaffhausen is served by the S24 of Zürich S-Bahn and local trains of Schaffhausen S-Bahn (S62), linking Schaffhausen station with Thayngen and Singen (Hohentwiel), respectively.

The S-Bahn services S1 and S62 are part of Bodensee S-Bahn, a network of regional trains around Lake Constance (Bodensee).

=== Bus ===
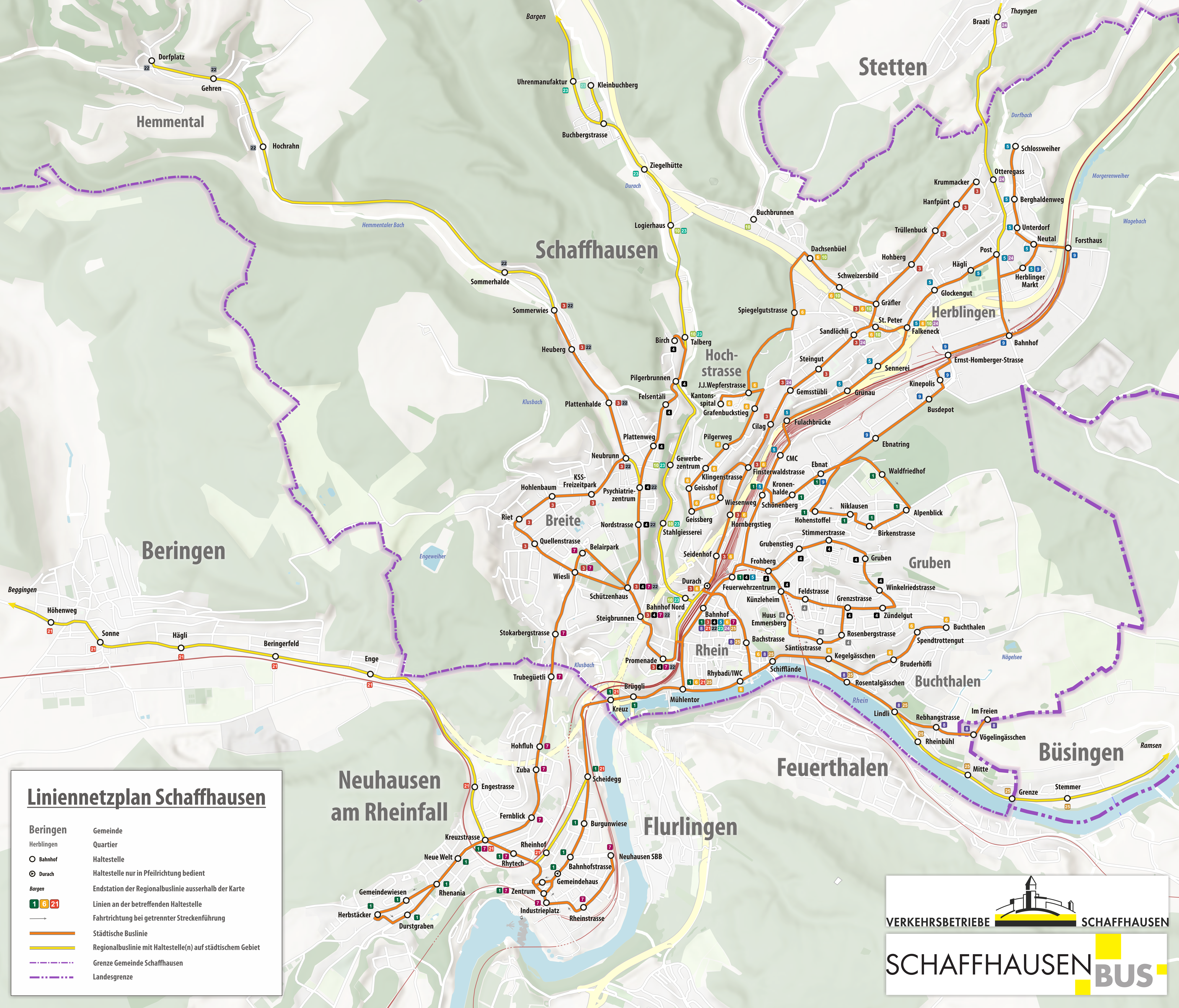
Urban bus routes of vbsh in the towns of Schaffhausen and Neuhausen am Rheinfall (as of December 2025)

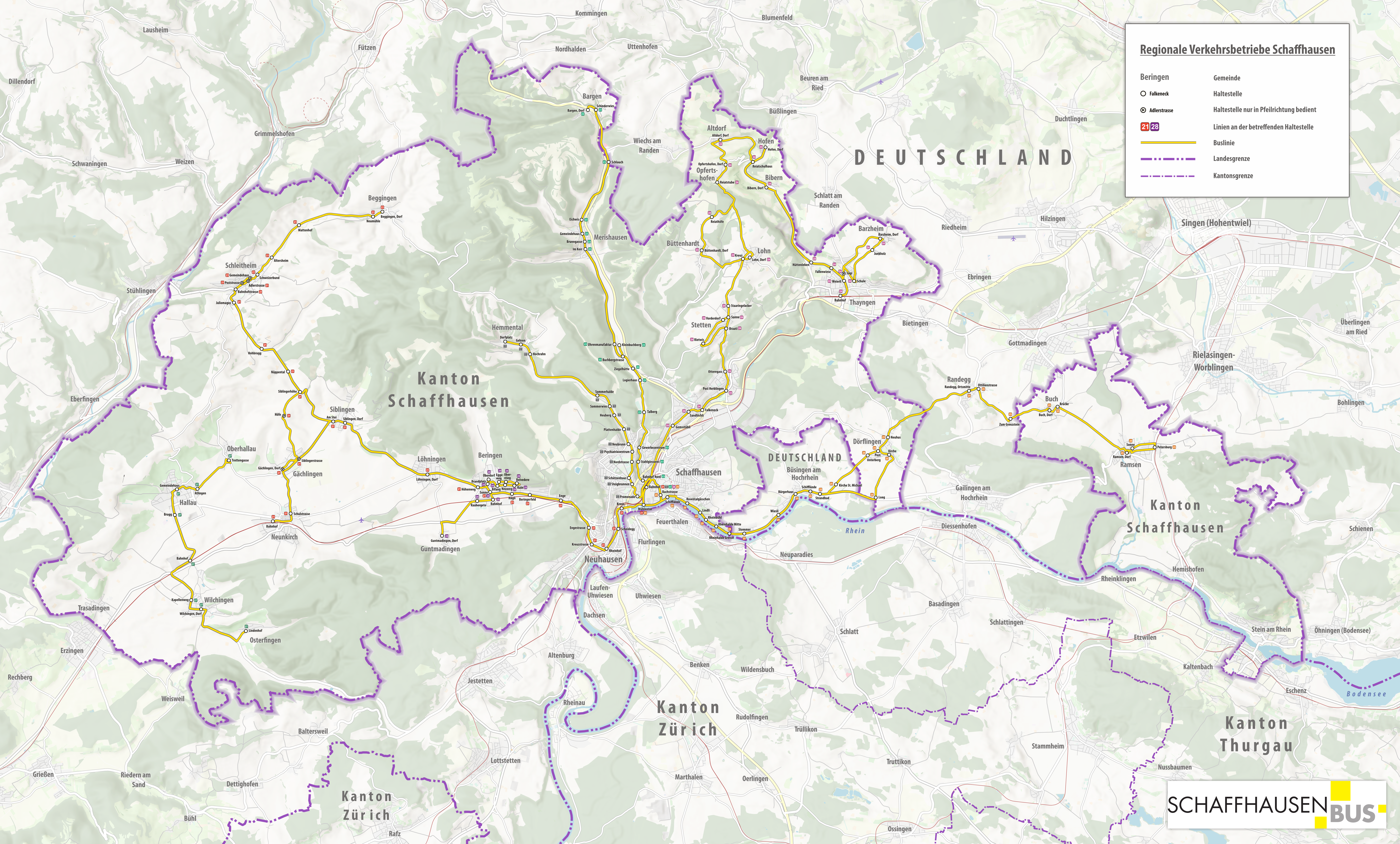
Regional bus routes of vbsh in the canton of Schaffhausen and neighboring German territory (as of December 2023)

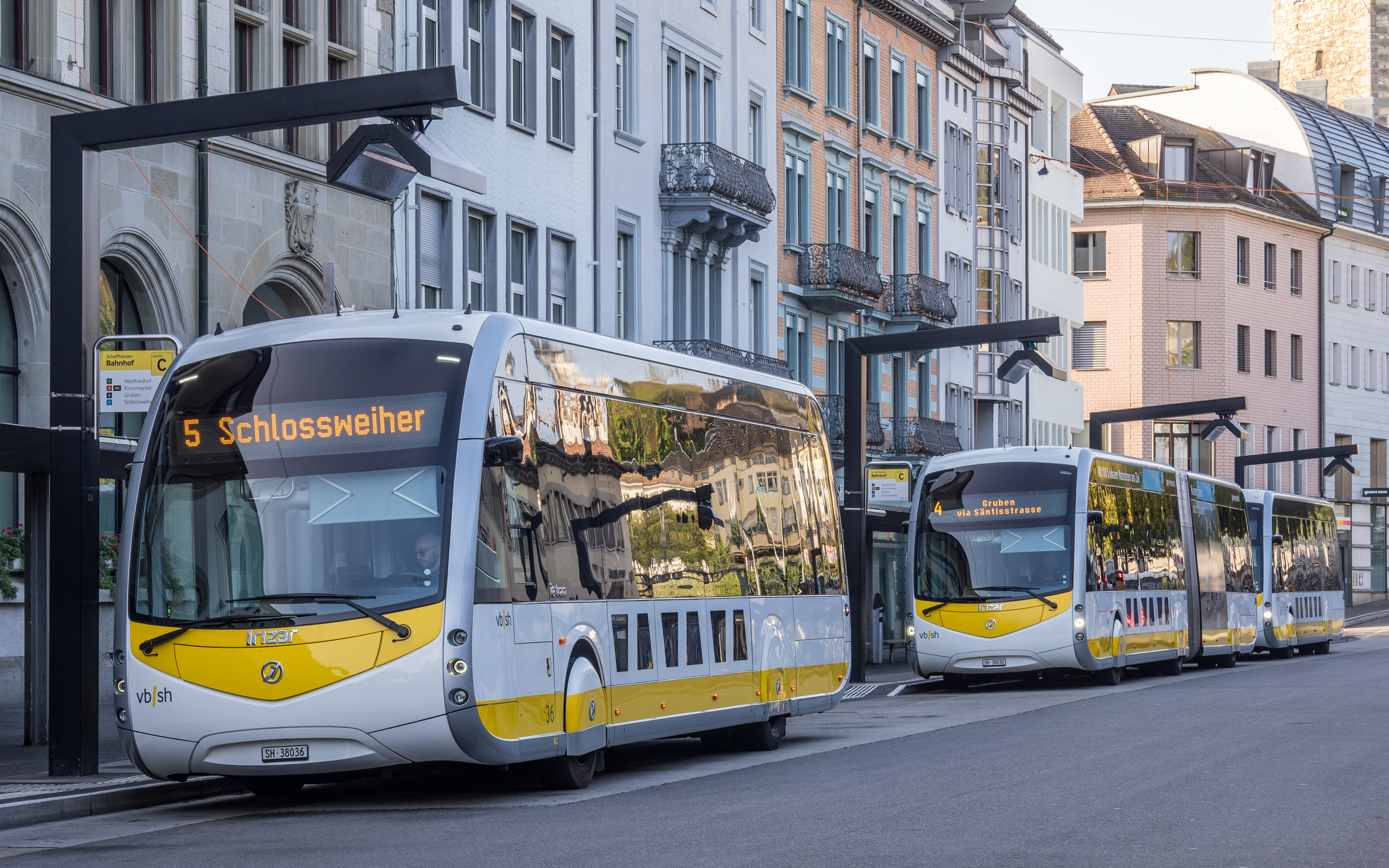
Battery electric buses at Bahnhofstrasse

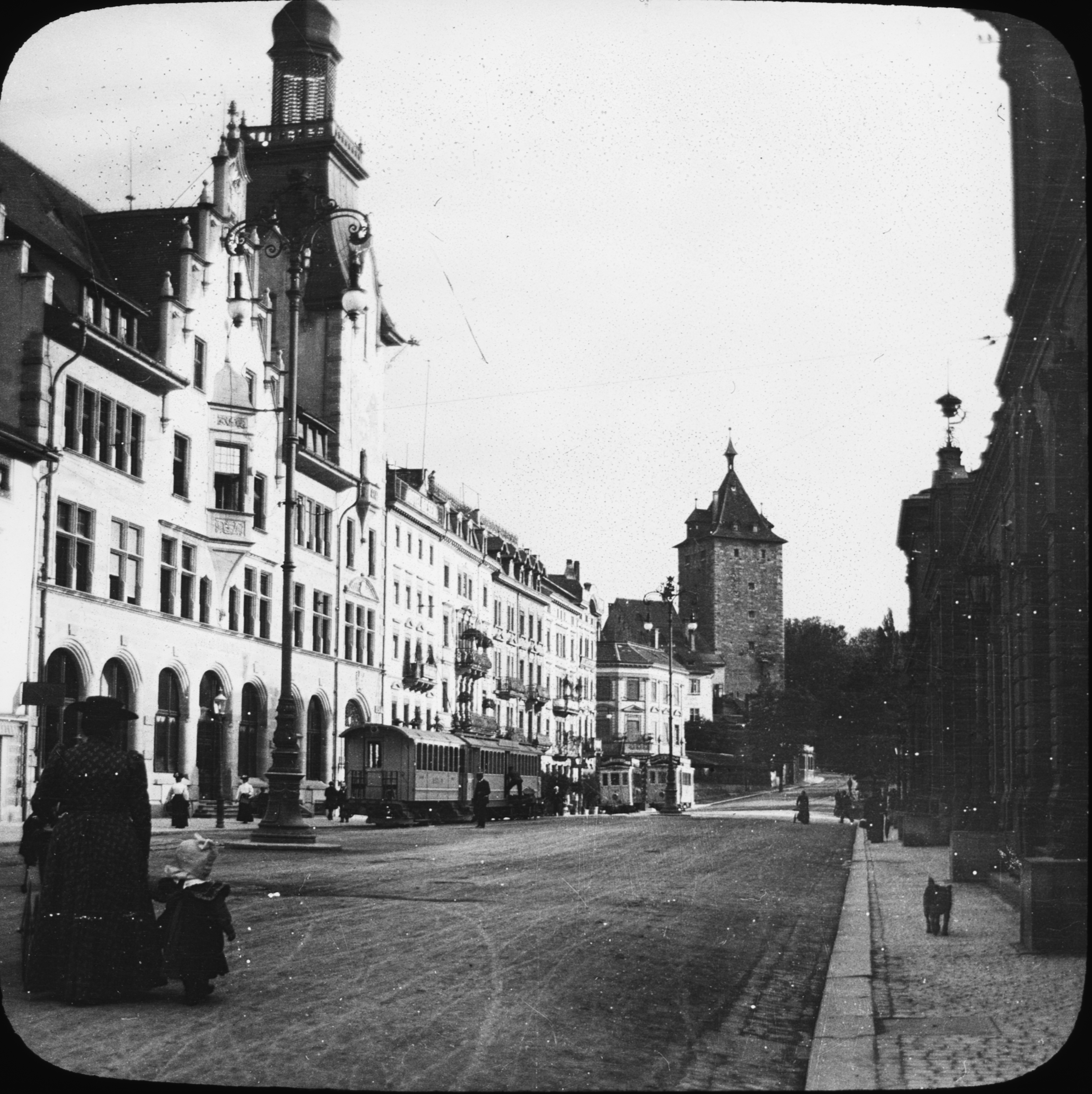
Bahnhofstrasse in 1906 with trams and interurban train to Schleitheim

Schaffhausen and the neighboring town of Neuhausen am Rheinfall have an urban bus network of 9 lines. Since 2019, lines (3–10) are operated by battery-powerd buses (Irizar) and diesel-powered buses. Until December 2025, line 1 was operated by trolleybuses, which replaced the former tram system, but since the closure of the trolleybus system line 1 is also operated by battery-electric buses. All routes except line 9 call at Schaffhausen railway station. Route 9 calls at Herblingen railway station. During weekends, there are night buses (designated as N#) operating after midnight.

The urban bus routes, which all operated by Verkehrsbetriebe Schaffhausen (vbsh), are as follows:

Line	Route
1	Herbstäcker – Neuhausen Zentrum – Schaffhausen railway station – Ebnat – Waldfriedhof
3	Sommerwies – Schützenhaus – Schaffhausen railway station – Krummacker
4	Birch – Schützenhaus – Schaffhausen railway station – Gruben
5	Schaffhausen railway station – Falkeneck – Einkaufszentren – Schlossweiher
6	Buchthalen – Schifflände – Rhybadi / IWC – Schaffhausen railway station – Kantonsspital – Falkeneck
7	Neuhausen SBB – Neuhausen Zentrum – Schützenhaus – Schaffhausen railway station
8	Schaffhausen railway station – Schifflände – Im Freien
9	Ebnat – Kinepolis – Herblingen railway station – Einkaufszentren
10	Schaffhausen railway station (North) – Logierhaus – Falkeneck
N1	Schaffhausen railway station – Schützenhaus – Riet – Sommerwies – Nordstrasse – Schaffhausen railway station
N2	Schaffhausen railway station – Geissberg – Pilgerweg – Gräfler – Krummacker – Schweizersbild – CILAG – Schaffhausen railway station
N3	Schaffhausen railway station – Mühlentor – Schifflände – Buchthalen – Gruben – Niklausen – Kinepolis – Ebnat – Schaffhausen railway station
N4	Schaffhausen railway station – Mühlentor – Neuhausen Zentrum – Kreuzstrasse – Herbstäcker – Hohfluh – Wiesli – Schaffhausen railway station

One of the previous urban routes, line 12 to the Rhine Falls, was the first route ever to feature a level 5 autonomous bus (2018–2019).

In addition, there are several regional bus services that link Schaffhausen with villages in the canton of Schaffhausen, the canton of Zürich and nearby German territory. The regional bus services 21–25, lines 630 and 634 and all night bus services (designated with N#) all depart from the forecourt of Schaffhausen railway station:

Line	Route	Operator
21	Schaffhausen railway station – Neuhausen – Beringen – Löhningen – Siblingen – Schleitheim – Beggingen	vbsh
22	Schaffhausen railway station – Hemmental	vbsh
23	Schaffhausen railway station – Merishausen – Bargen	vbsh
24	Schaffhausen railway station – Stetten – Lohn – Büttenhardt – Opfertshofen – Altdorf – Hofen – Bibern – Thayngen (– Barzheim)	vbsh
25	Schaffhausen railway station – Büsingen – Dörflingen – Randegg – Murbach – Buch – Ramsen	vbsh
630	Schaffhausen railway station – Feuerthalen – Flurlingen – Uhwiesen – Benken – Marthalen	Postauto
634	Schaffhausen railway station – Feuerthalen – Flurlingen – Uhwiesen – Dachsen – Schloss Laufen am Rheinfall	Postauto
N76	Schaffhausen railway station – Falkeneck – Schlossweiher – Thayngen, Hüttenleben – Thayngen railway station – Falkeneck – Schaffhausen railway station	vbsh
N77	Schaffhausen railway station – Neuhausen am Rheinfall – Beringen – Guntmadingen – Neunkirch – Oberhallau – Hallau – Wilchingen – Osterfingen – Trasadingen	vbsh

=== Boat ===
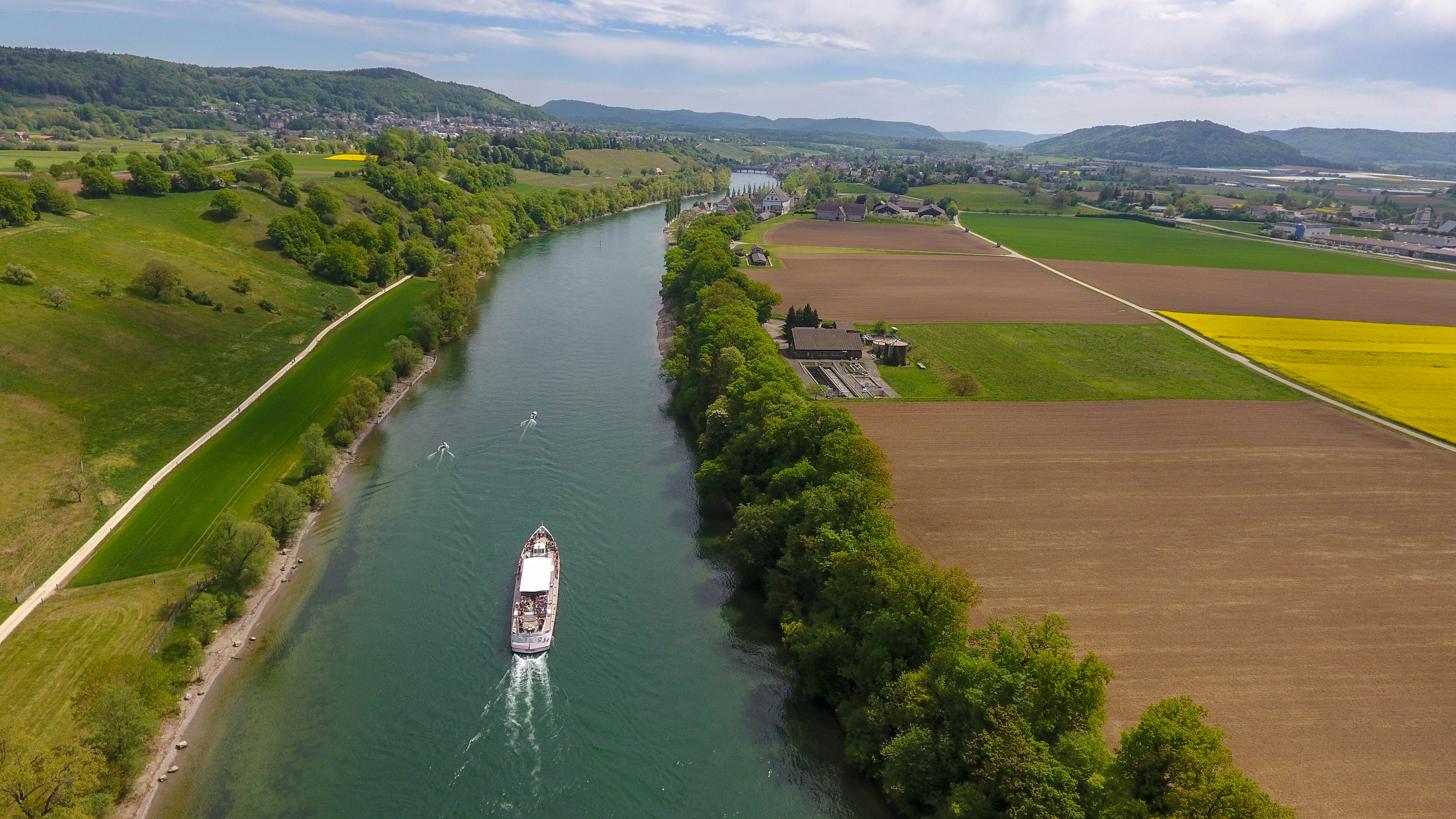
Boat of URh near Dörflingen on the High Rhine

Departing from Schifflände, there are regular boat trips on the river Rhine (High Rhine) to Stein am Rhein and Kreuzlingen (Lake Constance) offered by Schweizerische Schifffahrtsgesellschaft Untersee und Rhein (URh) during warmer seasons.

=== Private Transport ===
The A4 motorway connects Schaffhausen with Zürich. The A4 continues northward to Donaueschingen/Singen (Hohentwiel) in Germany. Since 1996, the A4 runs through a tunnel, bypassing the town's center. There are three nearby exits along the A4: Schaffhausen Süd, Schaffhausen Nord and Schaffhausen Schweizersbild.

The Hauptstrasse 13 connects Schaffhausen with villages in the western part of the canton (Klettgau), through the Galgenbucktunnel which opened in 2019, and with villages along the Rhine east of Schaffhausen.

== Culture ==
Heritage sites of national significance

There are 35 buildings or sites in Schaffhausen that are listed as Swiss heritage sites of national significance. This includes the entire old town of Schaffhausen, the city walls, the Giesserei +GF+ Werk I factory, the town and cantonal archives, the Schweizersbild Paleolithic cave and the Herblingen and Grüthalde Neolithic settlements. Additionally, there are four former guild houses and seven listed houses. There are only two listed religious buildings, the former Benedictine All Saints Abbey and the Church of St. John.

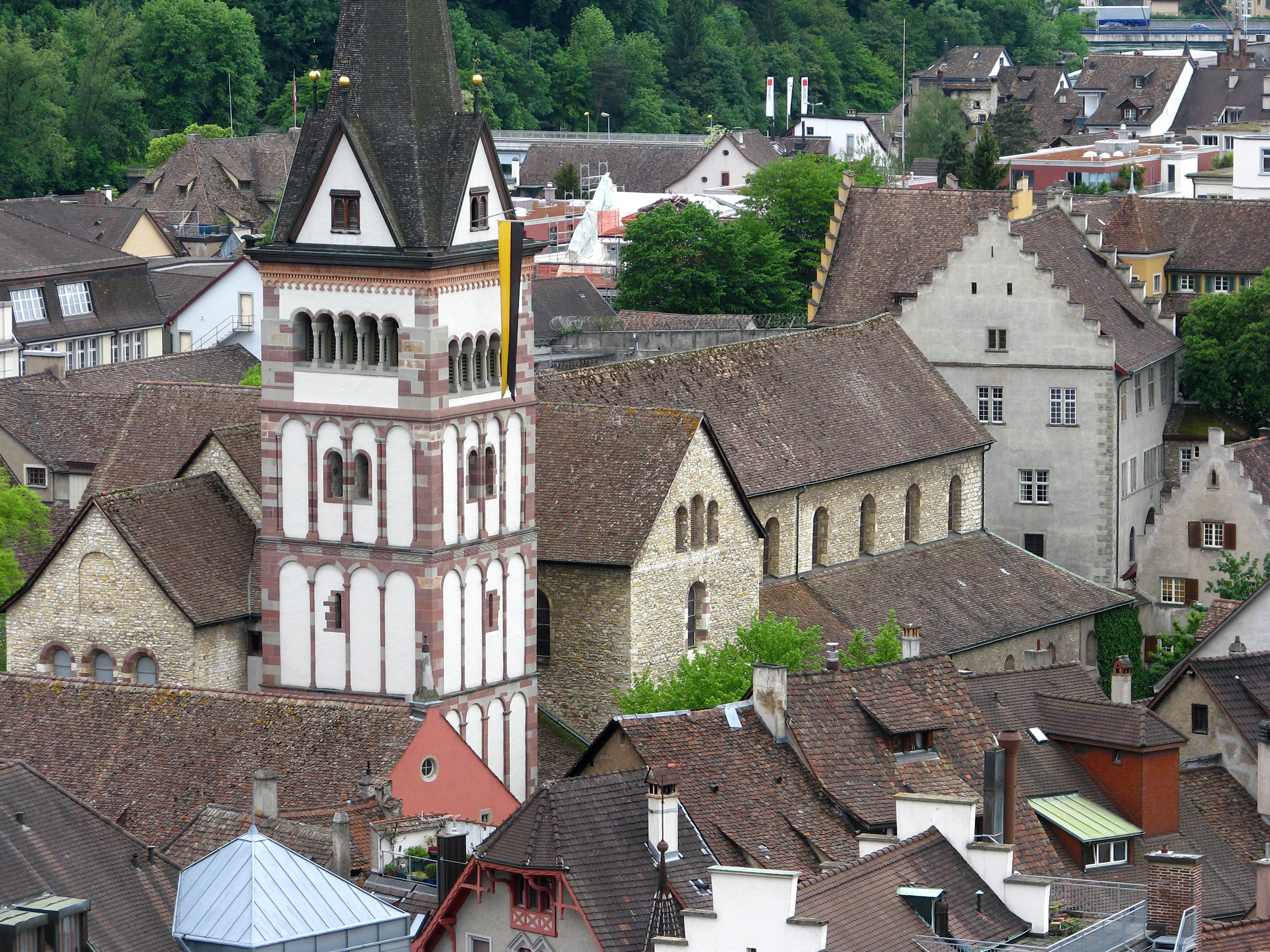
All Saints Abbey (German: Allerheiligen) as seen from Munot

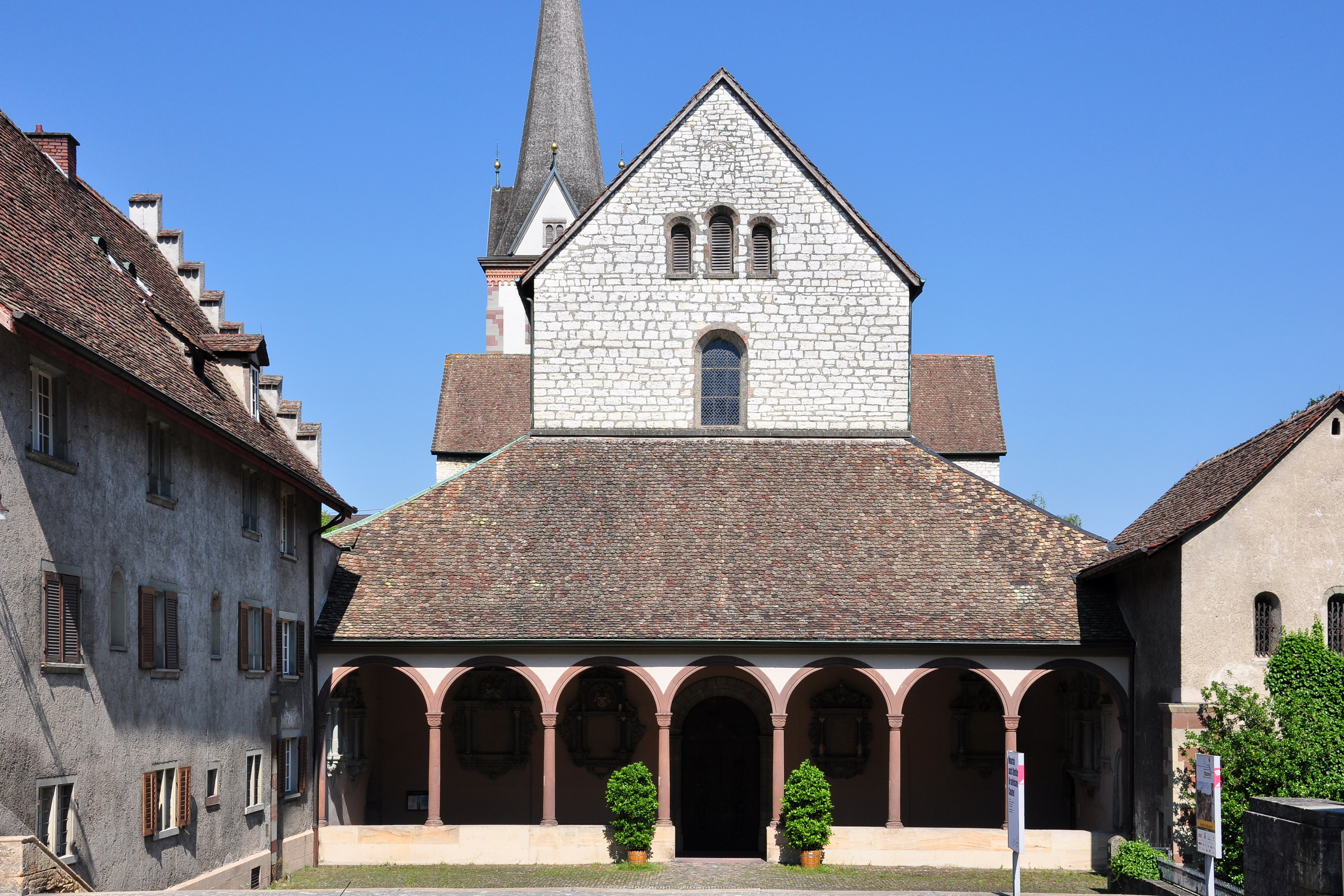
Church portal of Münster Schaffhausen

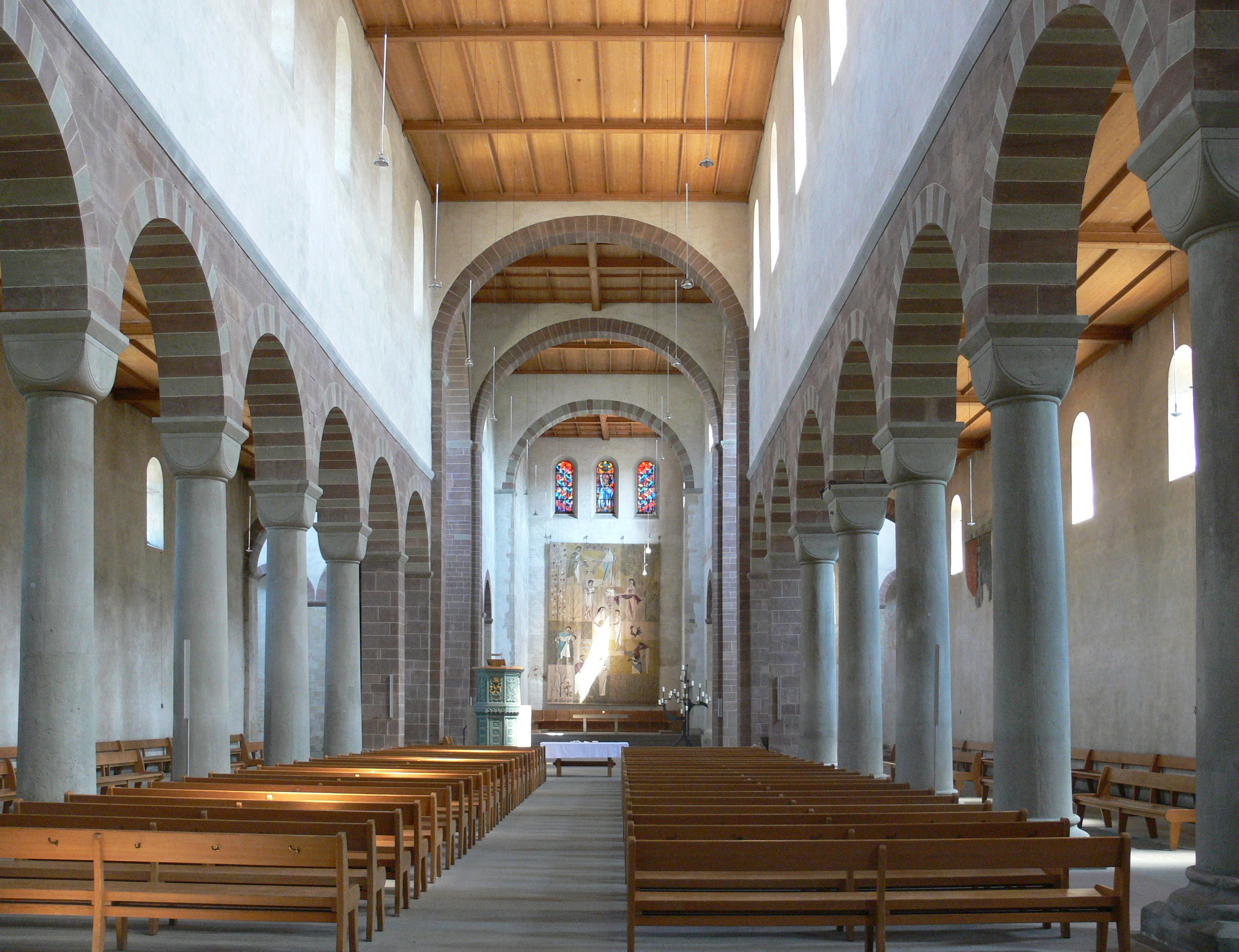
Cathedral interior of Münster Schaffhausen

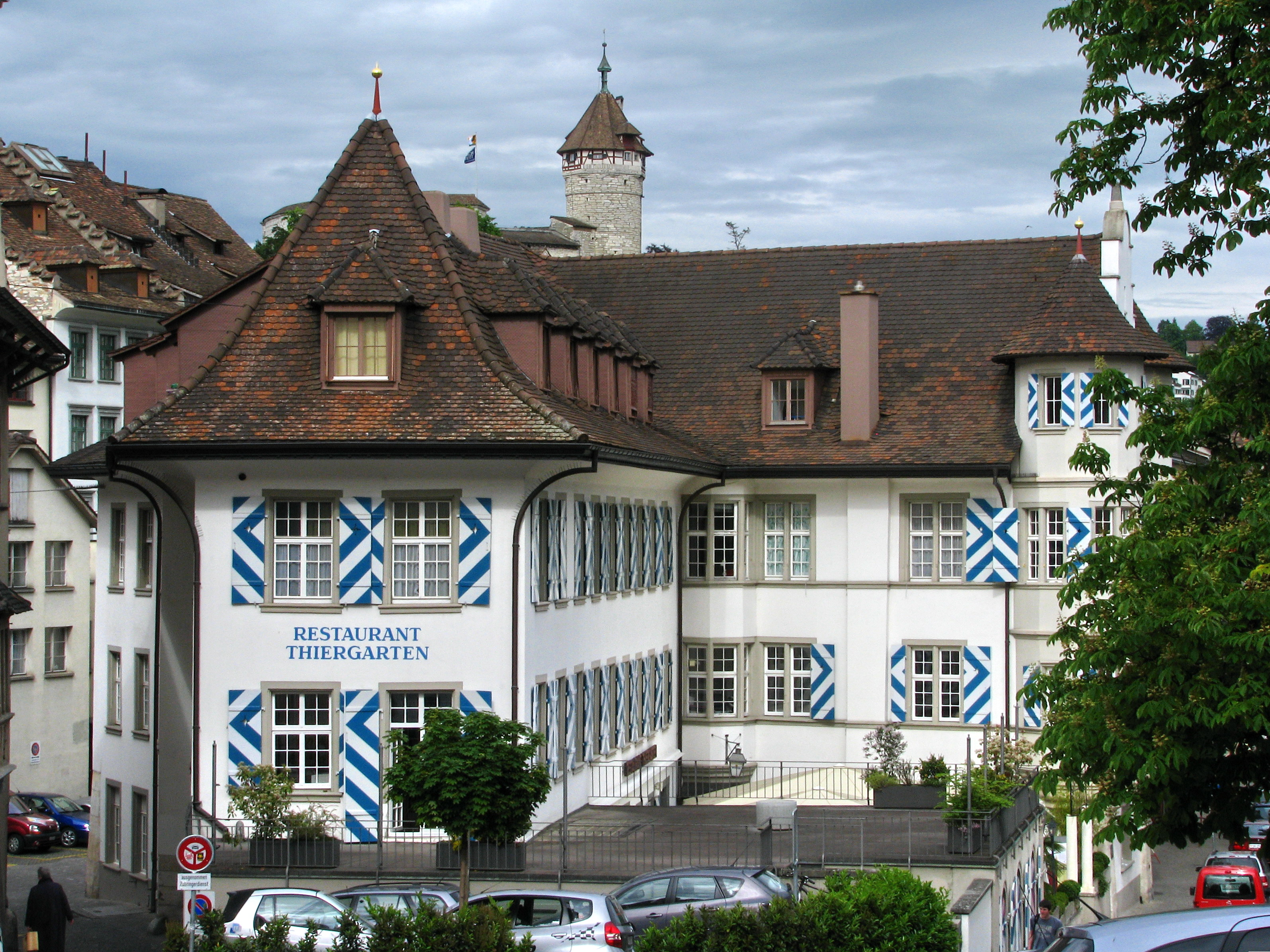
Restaurant Thiergarten and Munot tower

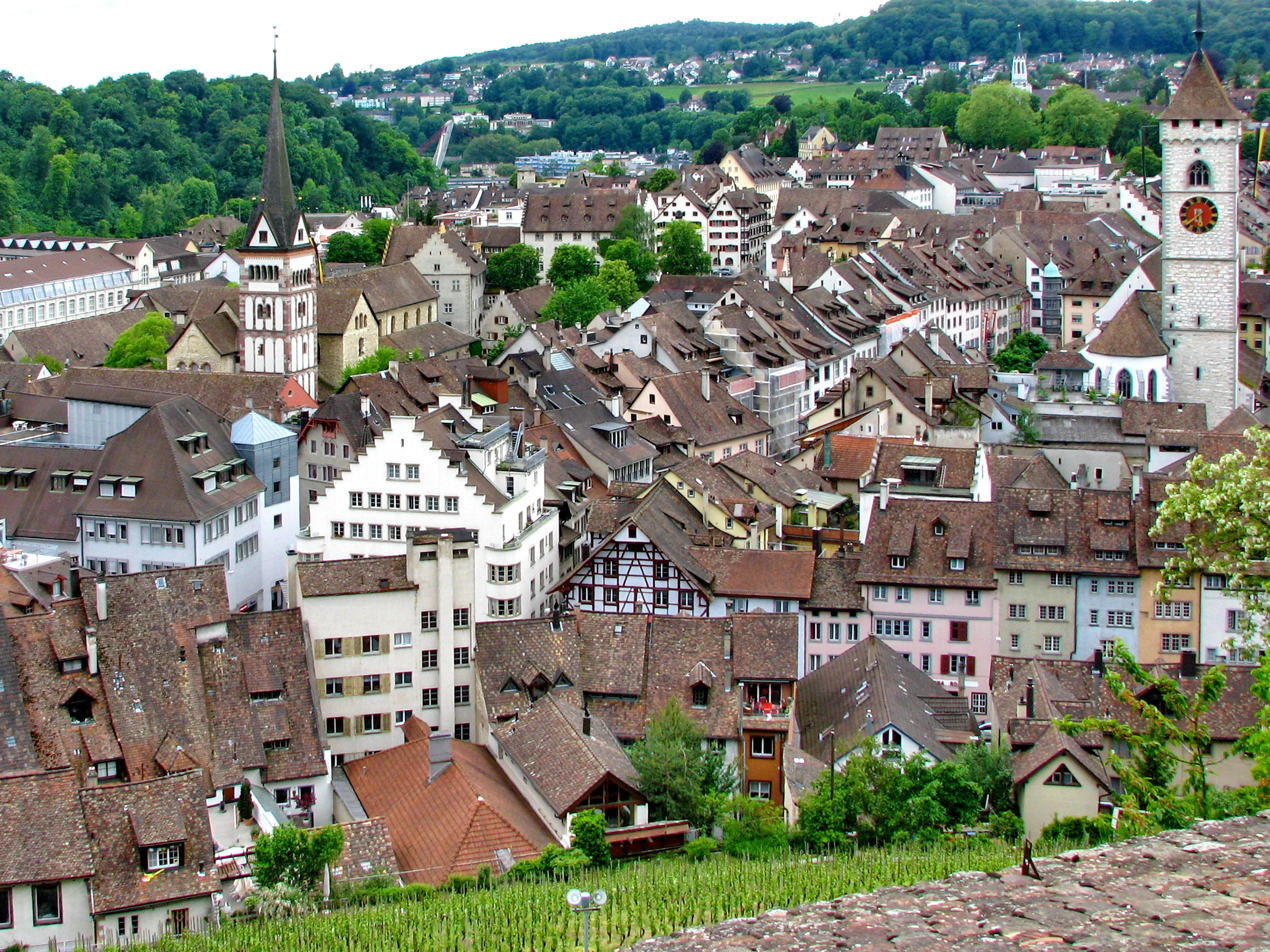
Altstadt

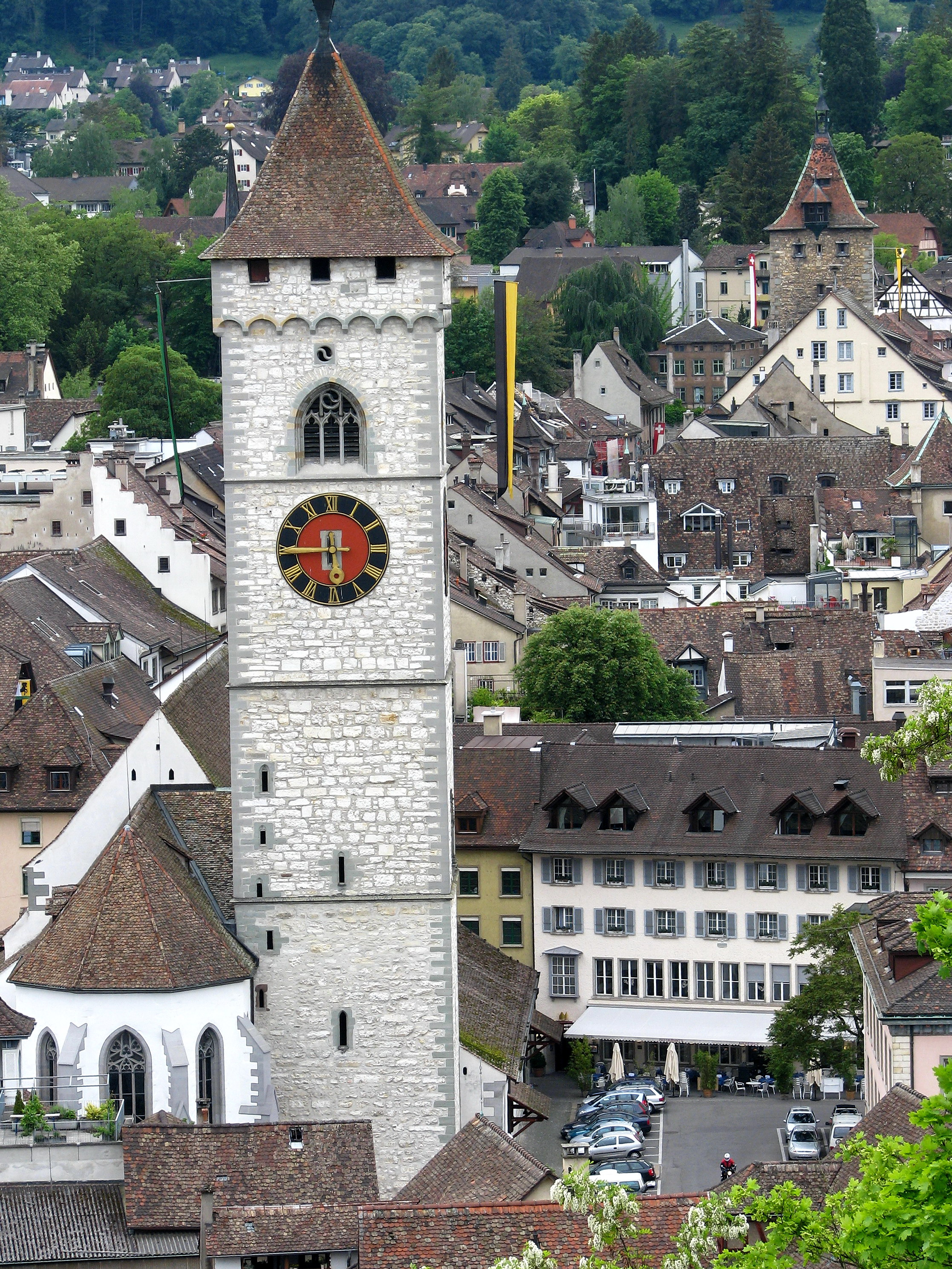
St. Johann

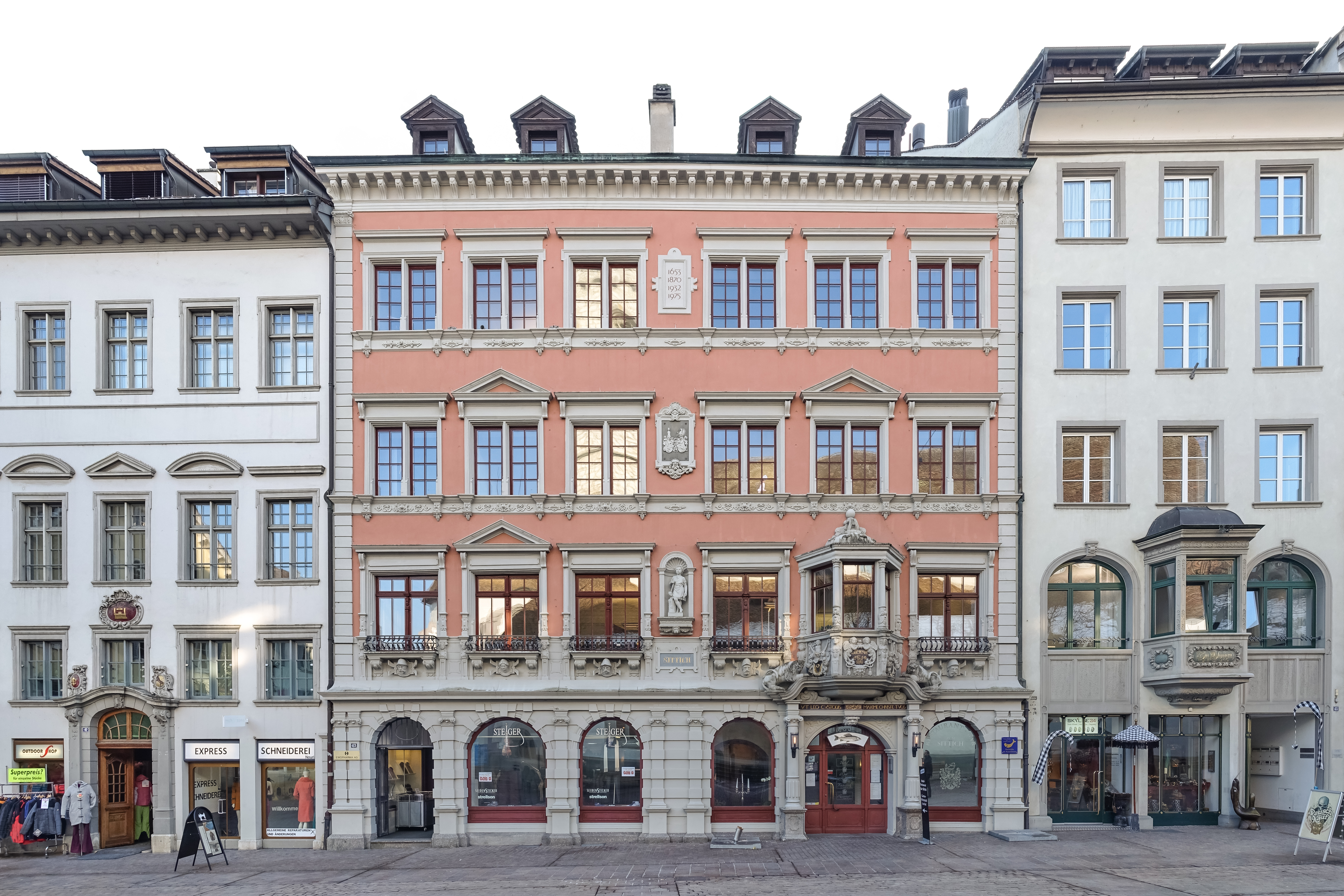
House zum Sittich at Vordergasse 43

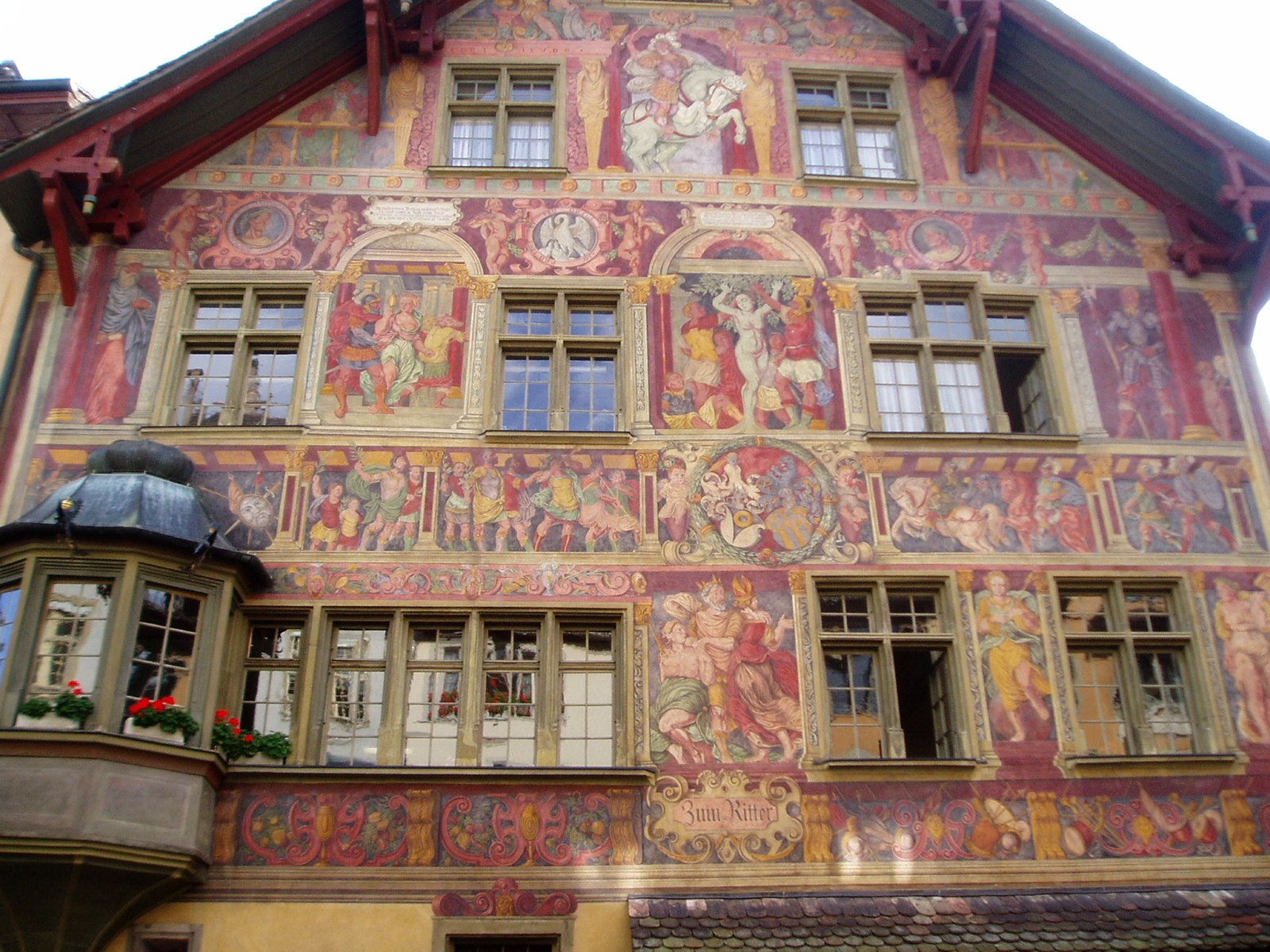
House zum Ritter at Vordergasse 65, one of the listed houses

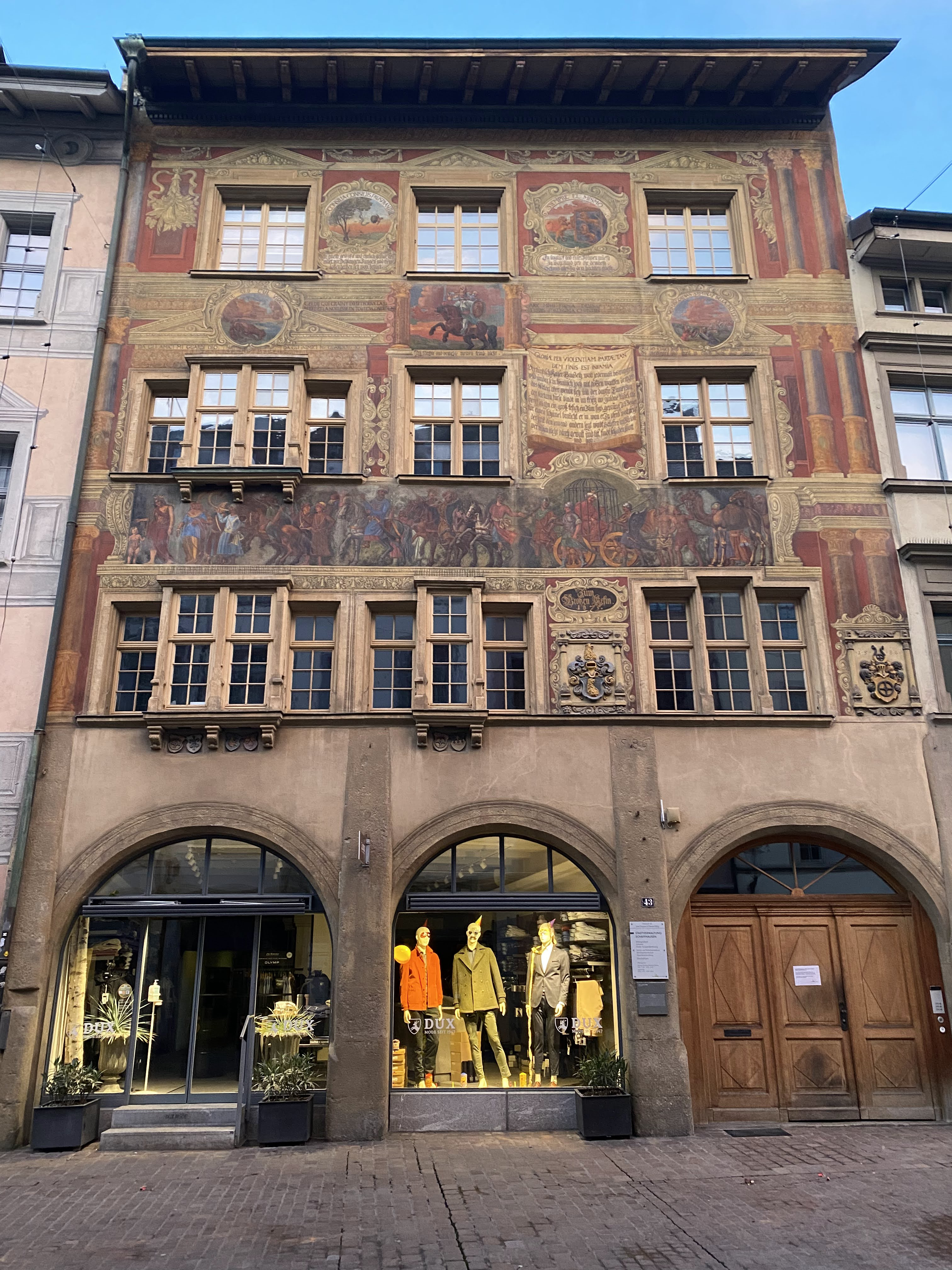
House zum Grossen Käfig at Vorstadt 43

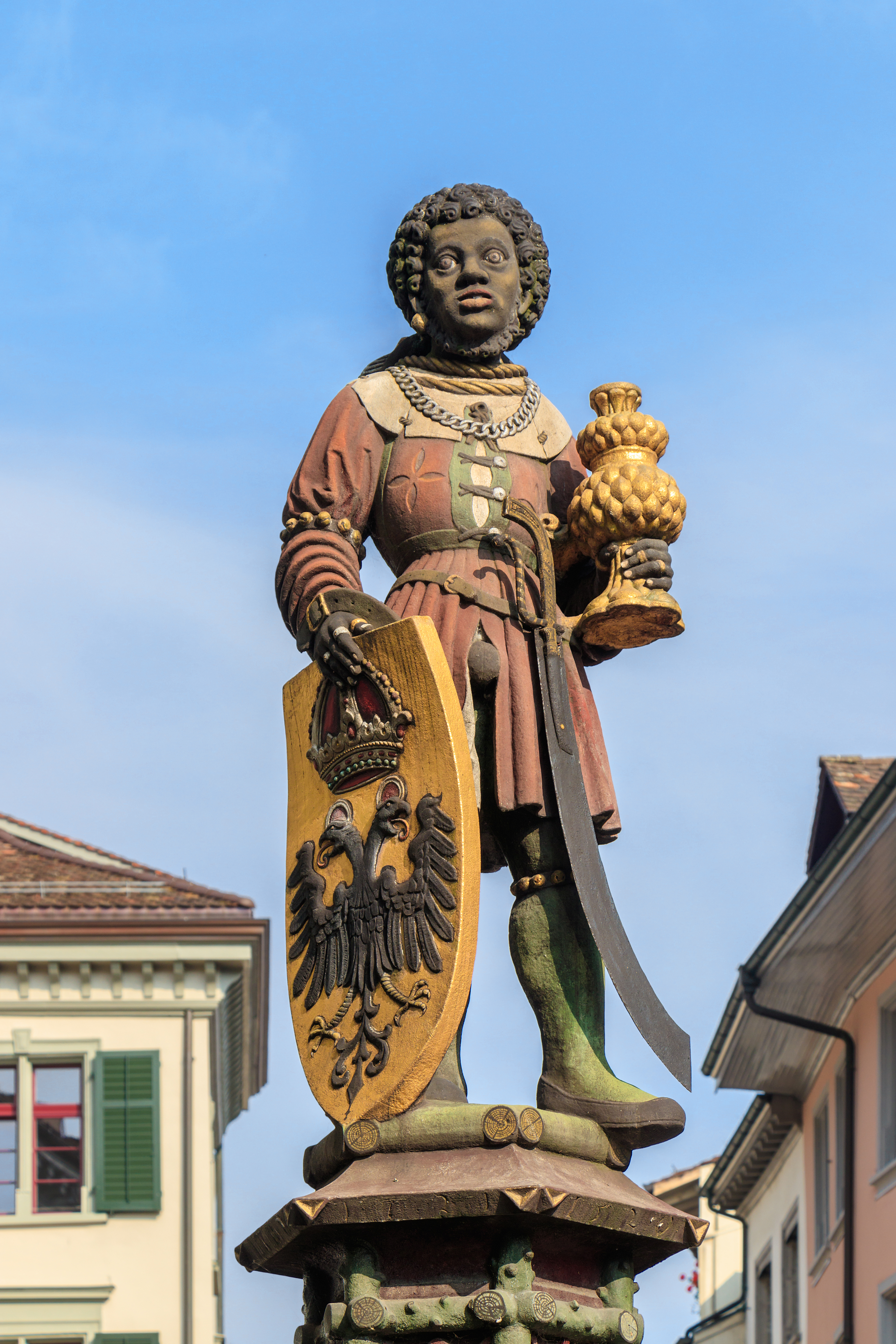
Mohrenbrunnen: fountain statue depicting Caspar of the Biblical Magi

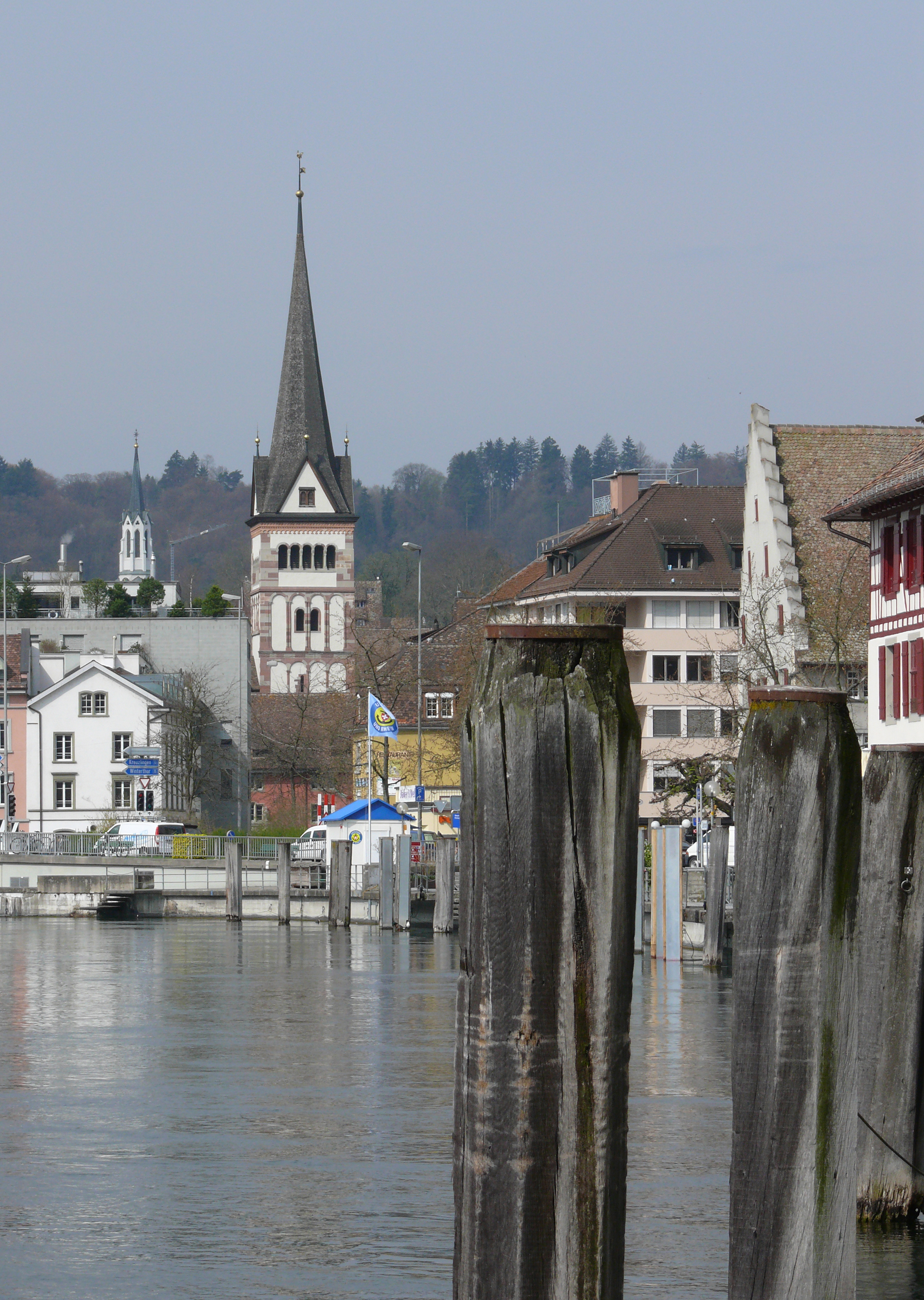
View of the Rhine, with Altstadt with the Münster

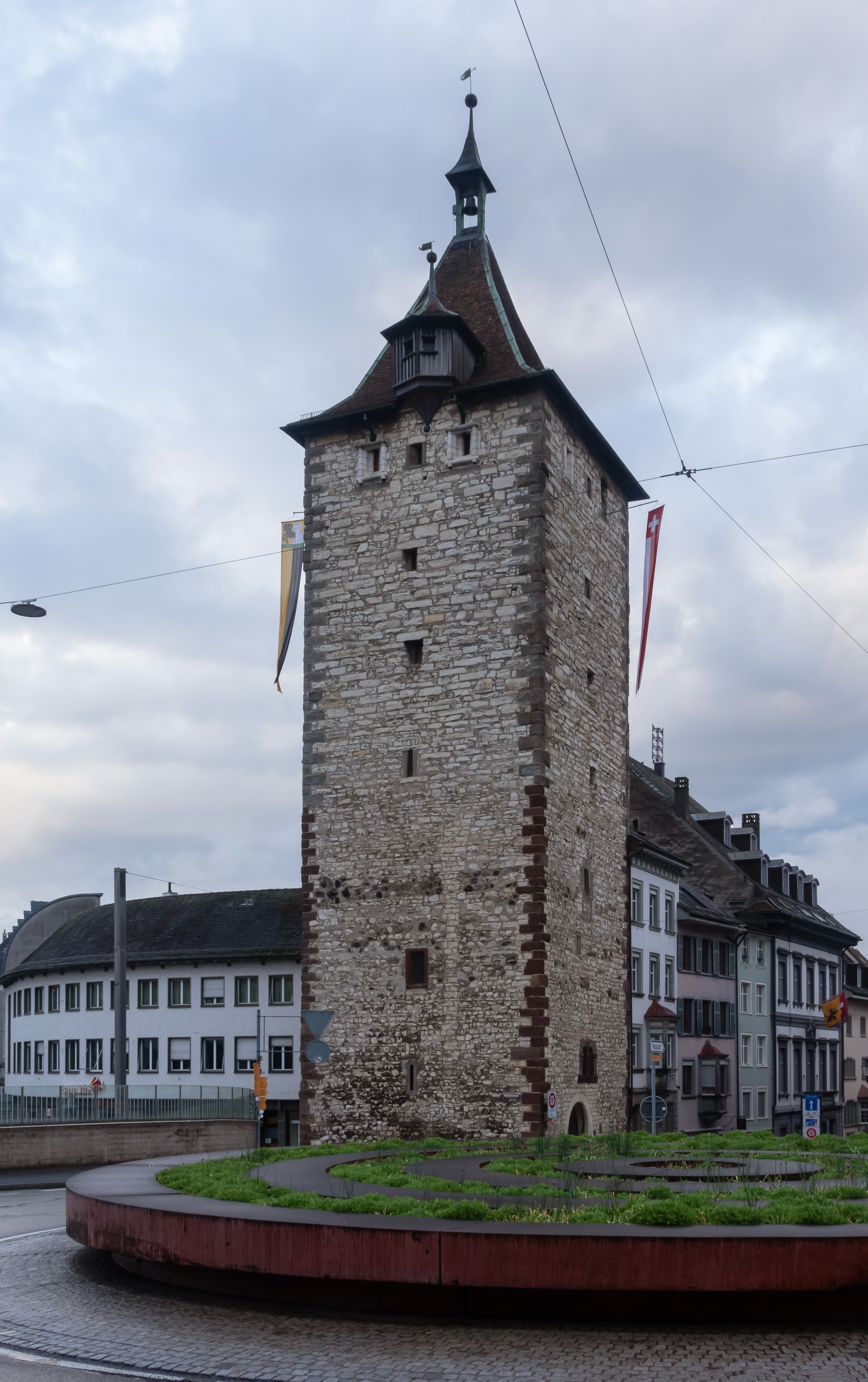
Towngate: Obertorturm (lit. 'Upper gate tower')

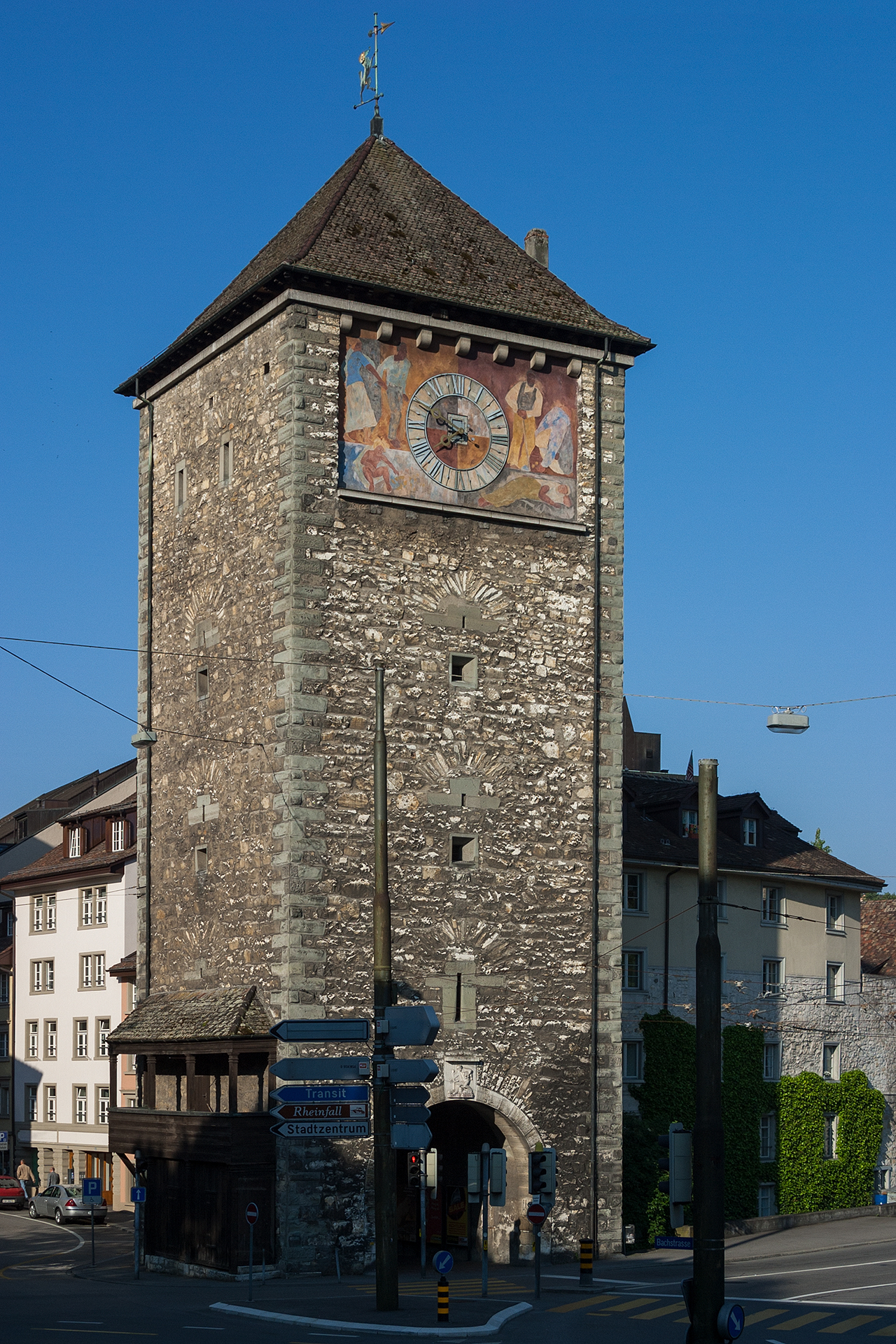
Towngate: Schwabentorturm (lit. 'Swabian gate tower')

== Economy ==
Schaffhausen hosts some well-known industrial companies like Georg Fischer (piping systems, machine tools and automotives) and ABB Schweiz AG (which acquired the local electrical engineering firm Carl Maier & Cie in 1992), internationally reputed manufacturers, internationally reputed manufacturers of watches (IWC and H. Moser & Cie), as well as Johnson & Johnson from pharmaceutical industry (former Cilag AG, founded by Bernhard Joos) and BB Biotech (biotechnologies). Tyco International, Garmin, Aptiv and cyber protection company Acronis are also incorporated in Schaffhausen.

== Sport ==
The town has two football teams, SV Schaffhausen, of the fourth-tier Swiss 1. Liga, and FC Schaffhausen, of the second-tier Swiss Challenge League. There is a football stadium in Breite, Schaffhausen which seats 4,200 persons, known as the Breitestadion. It is also the training headquarters for local children's football teams.

There is a handball team in Schaffhausen which plays in the first Swiss division: Kadetten Schaffhausen. They are centered at the BBC Arena on Schweizersbildstrasse. It was built in 2011 and seats up to 3,500 persons. Kadetten has been very successful and has won the second most titles in the history of the SHL.

In 2024, Schaffhausen hosted the World Men's Curling Championship.

== Notable people ==
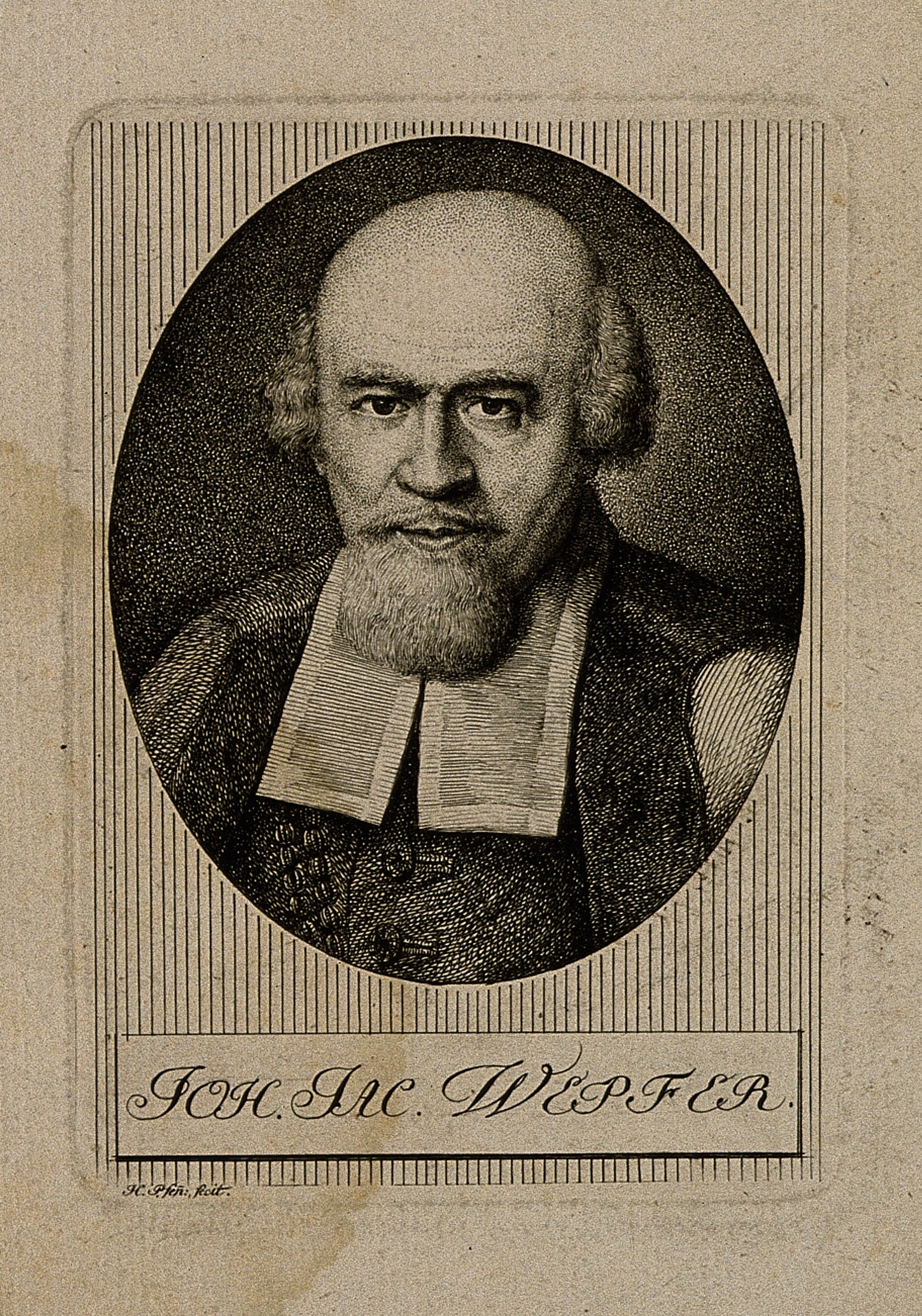
Johann Jakob Wepfer, engraving

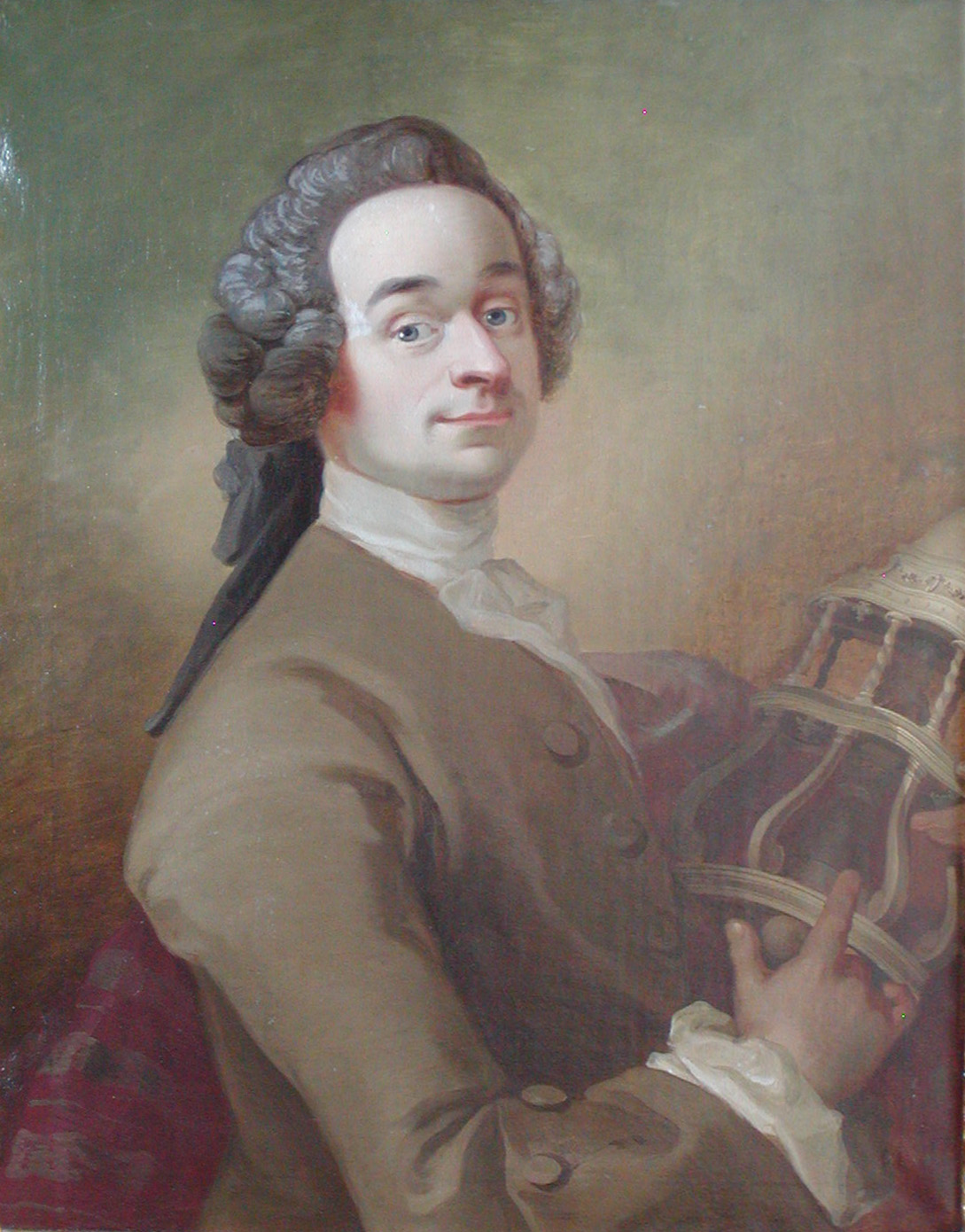
Lorentz Spengler, 1751

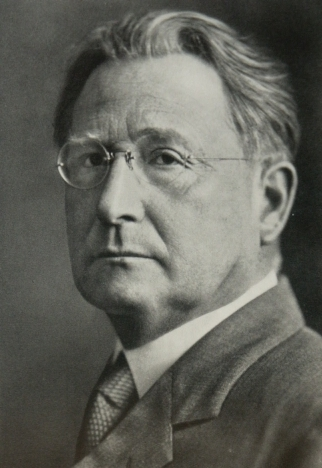
Emil Ermatinger, 1921

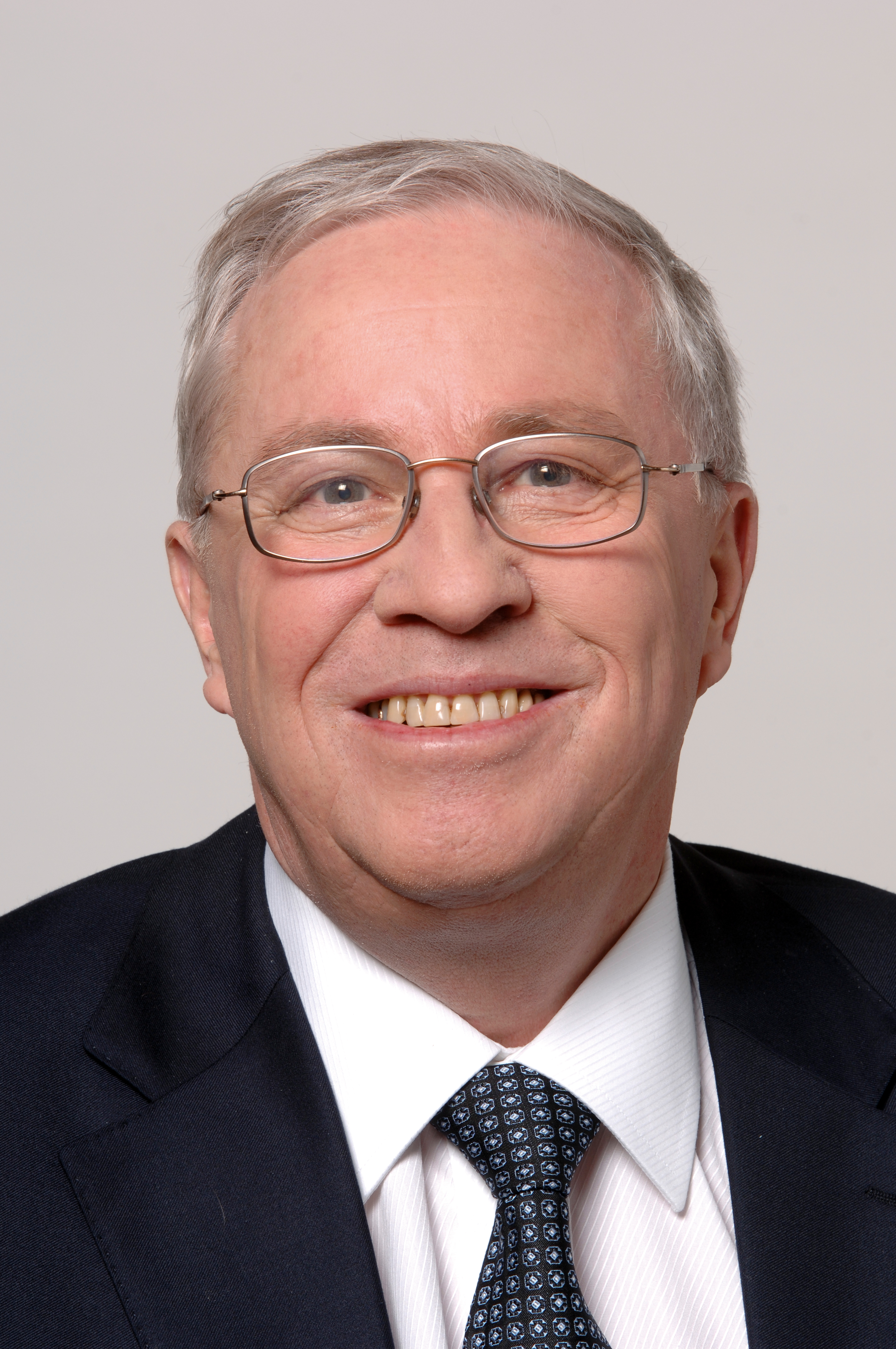
Christoph Blocher, 2007

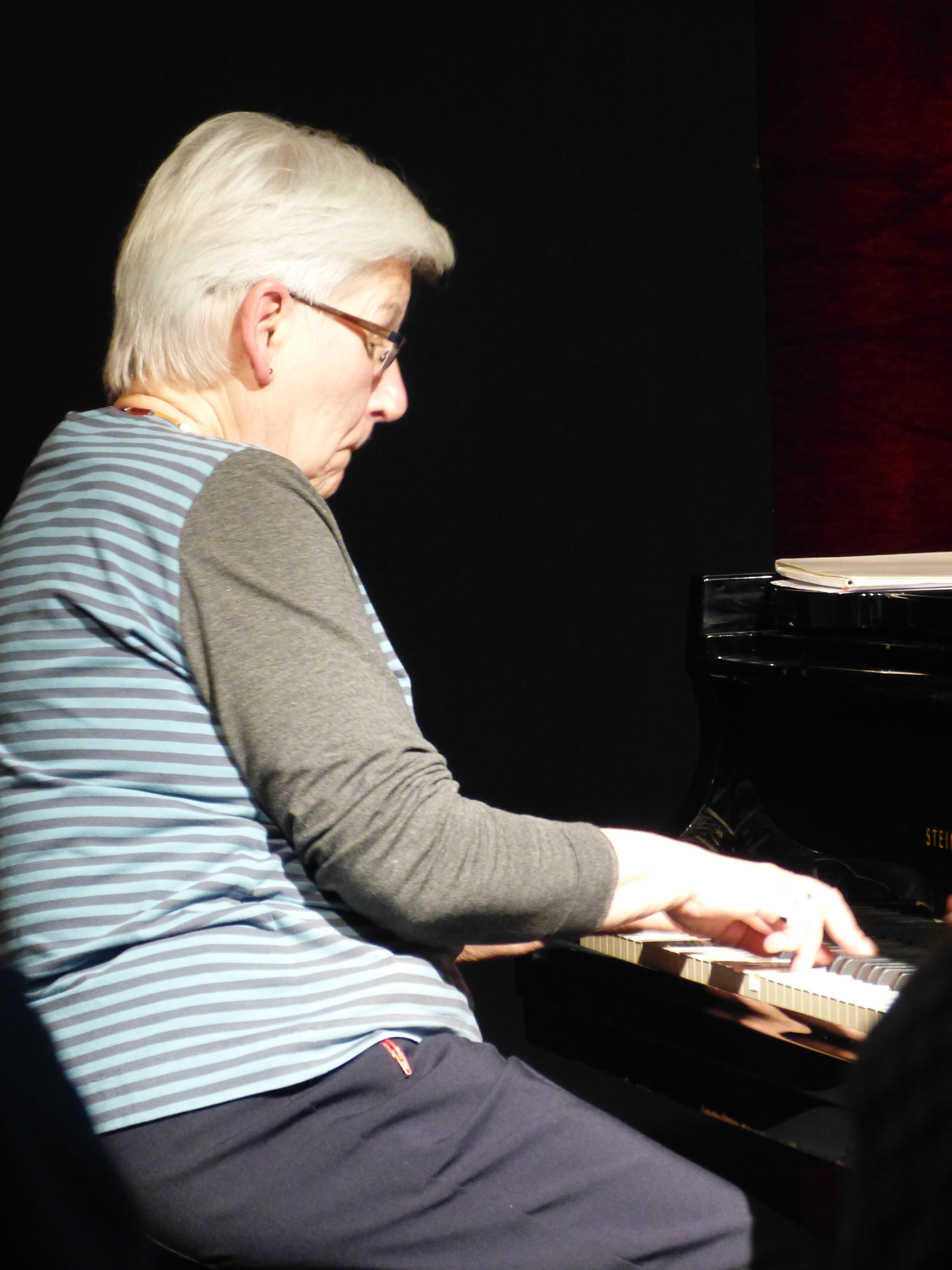
Irene Schweizer, 2014

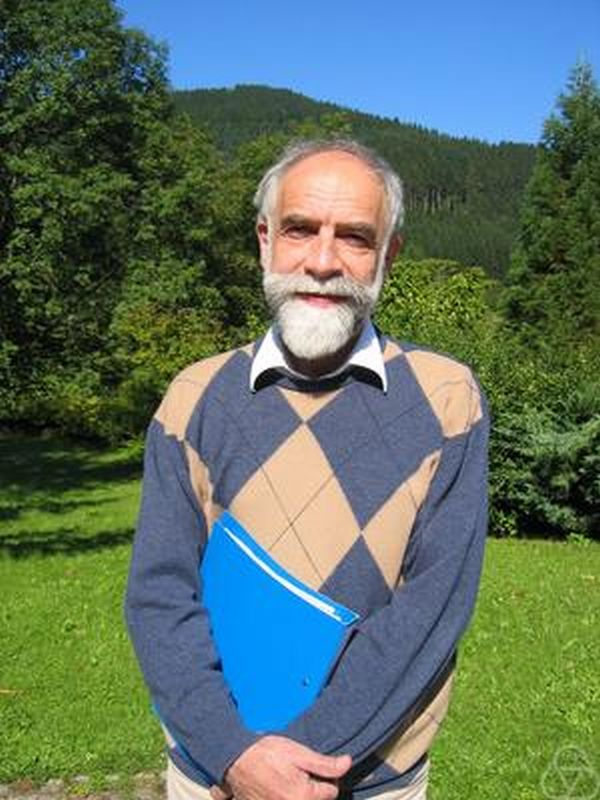
Juerg Froehlich, 2005

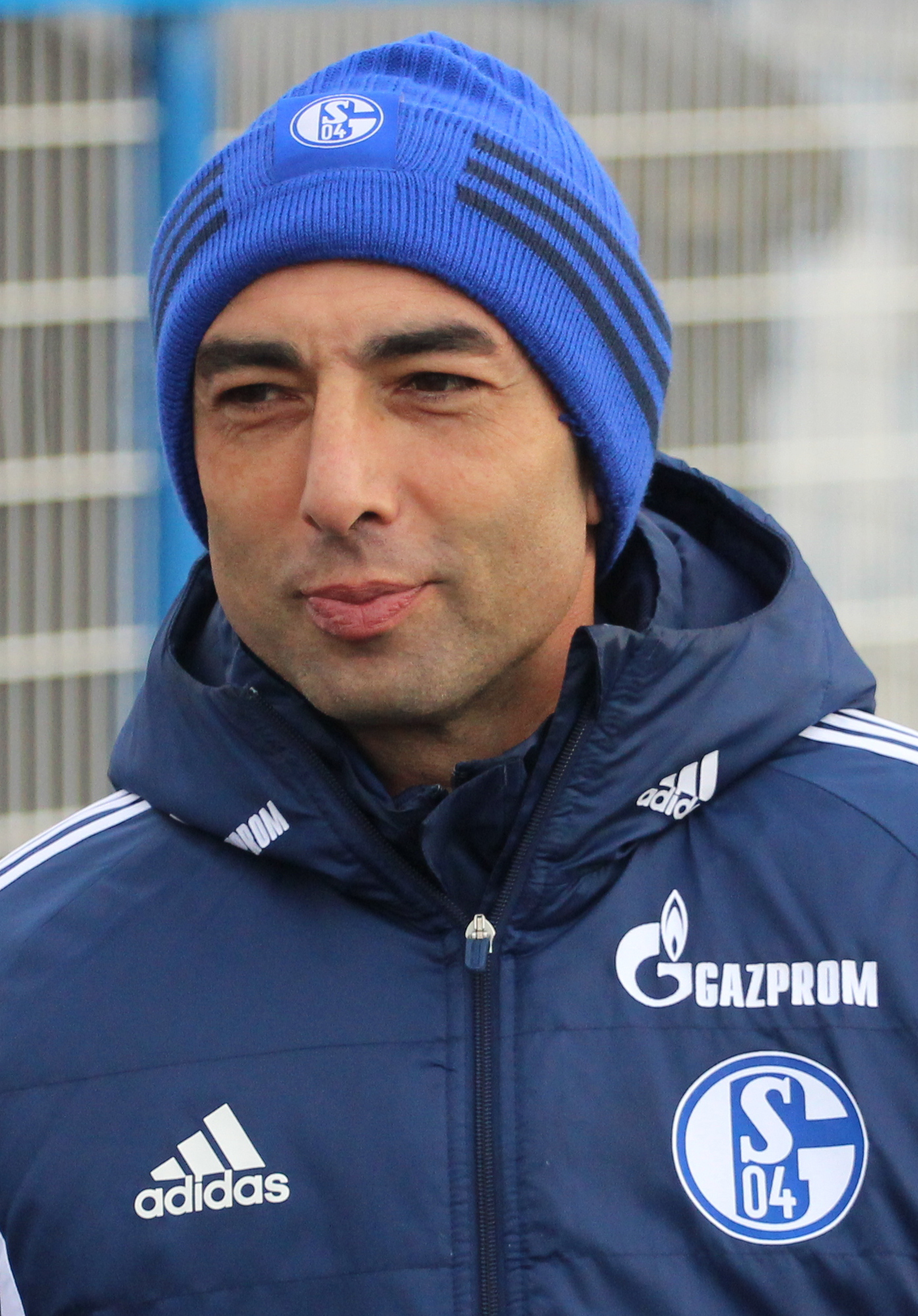
Roberto Di Matteo, 2015

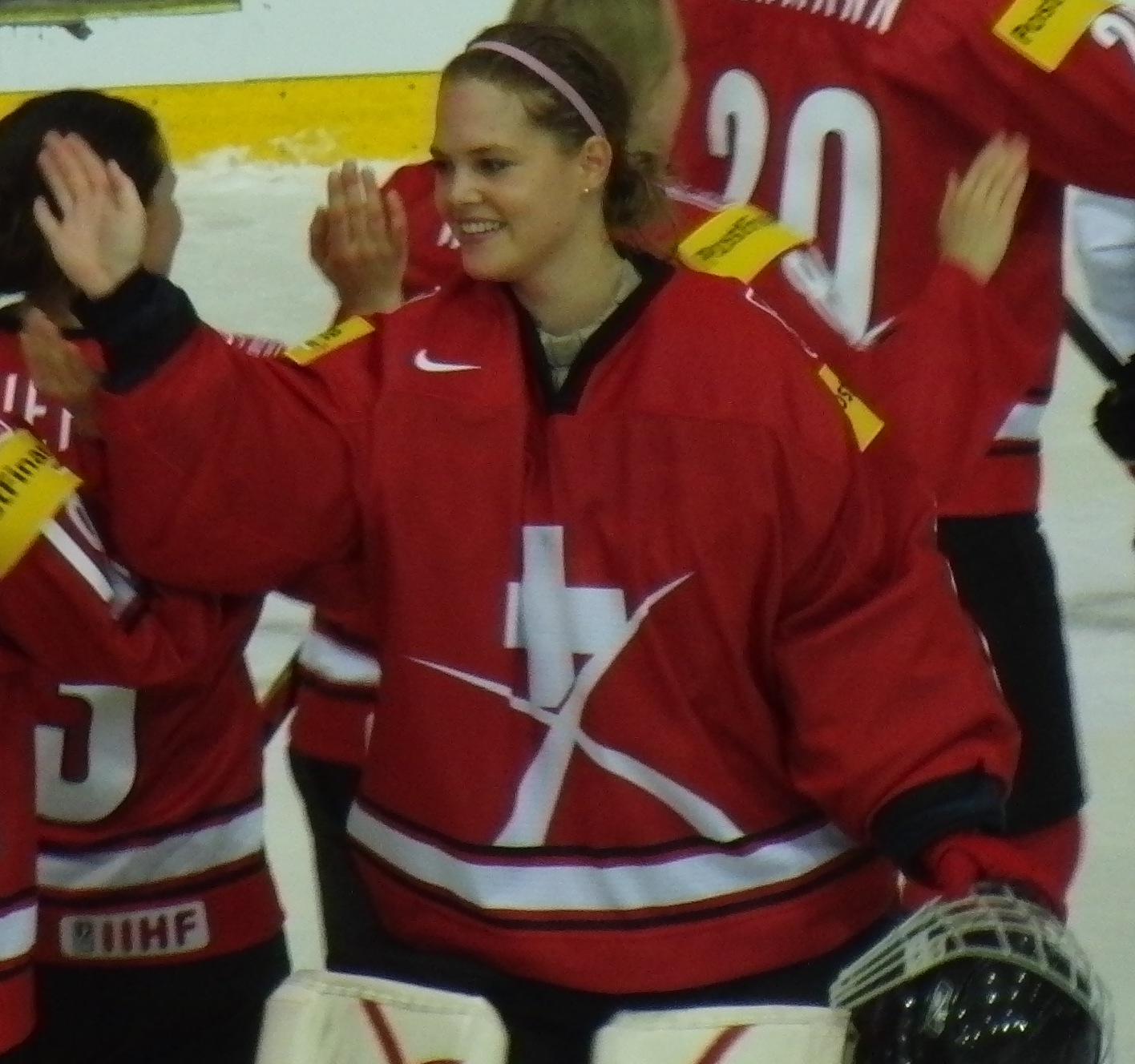
Florence Schelling, 2011

=== Pre-17th century ===
- Bernold of Constance (c.1054–1100 in Schaffhausen), chronicler and writer of religious tracts
- Johann Geiler von Kaisersberg (1445–1510), priest, a popular preacher of the 15th-century
- Sebastian Hofmeister (1476–1533), known in writing as Oeconomus or Oikonomos, was a Swiss monk and religious Reformer
- Tobias Stimmer (1539–1584), painter and illustrator, particularly of the Strasbourg astronomical clock
- Daniel Lindtmayer (1552–c.1605), the fourth generation of artists and glass painters

=== 17th century ===
- Johann Jakob Wepfer (1620–1695), pathologist and pharmacologist
- Johann Conrad Peyer (1653–1712), anatomist
- Johann Konrad Ammann (1669–1724), physician and instructor of non-verbal deaf persons
- Andrew Schalch (1692–1776), the first gun-founder at the Royal Arsenal in Woolwich

=== 18th century ===
- George Michael Moser (1706–1783), chaser and enameller, co-founder of the Royal Academy in 1768
- Johann Amman (1707–1741), Swiss-Russian botanist, a member of the Royal Society and professor of botany
- John Snetzler (1710–1785), organ builder who worked mostly in England
- Lorenz Spengler (1720–1807), Danish turner and naturalist.
- Johann Jakob Schalch (1723–1789), painter, noted for his paintings of the Rhine Falls in Schaffhausen
- Johann Conrad Ammann (1724–1811), physician, naturalist and collector of fossils
- Johannes von Müller (1752–1809), historian
- Johann Conrad Fischer (1773–1854), metallurgist, inventor, and pioneer in the steel industry; founded Georg Fischer AG in 1802
- Friedrich Emmanuel von Hurter (1787–1865), Protestant cleric and historian who converted to Roman Catholicism
- Caroline Mezger (1787–1843), painter, printmaker, and art teacher

=== 19th century ===
- Heinrich Moser (1805–1874), watchmaker and entrepreneur
- Johann Heinrich Gelzer (1813–1889), historian and diplomat
- Hans Bendel (1814–1853), painter and illustrator
- Ferdinand Hurter (1844–1898), industrial chemist who settled in England, researched photography
- Dame Sophia Wintz DBE (1847–1929), British philanthropist who co-founded the Royal Sailors' Rests in Plymouth and Portsmouth
- Ernst Homberger (1869–1955), industrialist, company director at Georg Fischer and IWC Schaffhausen
- Emil Ermatinger (1873–1953), professor for Germanic philology
- Ferdinand Schalch (1848–1918), paleontologist and geologist
- Hermann Rorschach (1884–1922), psychiatrist and psychoanalyst (brought up in Schaffhausen)
- Bernhard Peyer (1885–1963), paleontologist and anatomist
- Karl Jäger (1888–1959), mid-ranking official in the SS of Nazi Germany, perpetrated acts of genocide during the Holocaust
- Walther Bringolf (1895–1981), mayor of Schaffhausen (1933–1968); former President of the National Council of Switzerland (1961–1962)

=== 20th century ===
- Richard Meili (1900–1991), scientist in practical psychology, diagnostics, personality development and intelligence
- Conrad Beck (1901–1989), composer and head of Music of Radio Basel 1933–1963
- Carl Alfred Meier (1905–1995), psychiatrist, Jungian psychologist, scholar, and first president of the C. G. Jung Institute in Zürich
- Cardinal Gilberto Agustoni (1922–2017), prelate of the Roman Catholic Church
- Ernst Hess (1912–1968), conductor, composer and musicologist
- Rita Wolfensberger (1928–2020), classical pianist
- Bruno Meyer (born 1938), religious leader and founder of the Menorah church; convicted in 2010 for rape and child sexual abuse
- Markus Werner (1944–2016), writer, author of the novels Zündels Abgang
- Christoph Blocher (born 1940), politician, industrialist and former member of the Swiss Federal Council
- Pia Gyger (1940–2014), specialist for special education and psychologist
- Irène Schweizer (1941–2024), jazz and free improvising pianist
- Jürg Fröhlich (born 1946), mathematician and theoretical physicist
- Giorgio Behr (born 1948), businessman, lawyer, accountant and university professor
- Beat Furrer (born 1954), Austrian composer and conductor
- Philipp Landmark (born 1966), journalist and former editor-in-chief of the St. Galler Tagblatt
- Tom Strala (born 1974), designer, architect and artist

=== Sport ===
- Jules Ehrat (1905–1997), chess player, the 1942 joint Swiss Chess Champion
- Liselotte Kobi (1930–2022), former swimmer, competed at the 1948 and 1952 Summer Olympics
- Marianne Gossweiler (born 1943), equestrian, medallist in team dressage at both the 1964 and 1968 Summer Olympics
- Meta Antenen (born 1949), pentathlete, won nine medals at European championships, competing for LC Schaffhausen
- Stefan Maurer (1960–1994), cyclist, competed in the individual road race at the 1984 Summer Olympics
- Stephan Lehmann (born 1963), retired football goalkeeper, goalkeeper coach for FC Sion, 538 team games and 14 for the national side
- Roberto Di Matteo (born 1970), Italian professional football manager and former player, won FA Cup and UEFA Champions League in 2012
- Daniela Baumer (born 1971), sprint canoer, silver medallist at the 1996 Summer Olympics
- Florence Schelling (born 1989), ice hockey goaltender and three-time Olympian; first woman to be named GM of a professional men's team in the world (SC Bern)

== See also ==
- Cholfirst Radio Tower
- List of mayors of Schaffhausen
- Bombing of Schaffhausen in World War II
