= Scots Monastery Constance =

Coordinates: 47.666265°N 9.173302°E

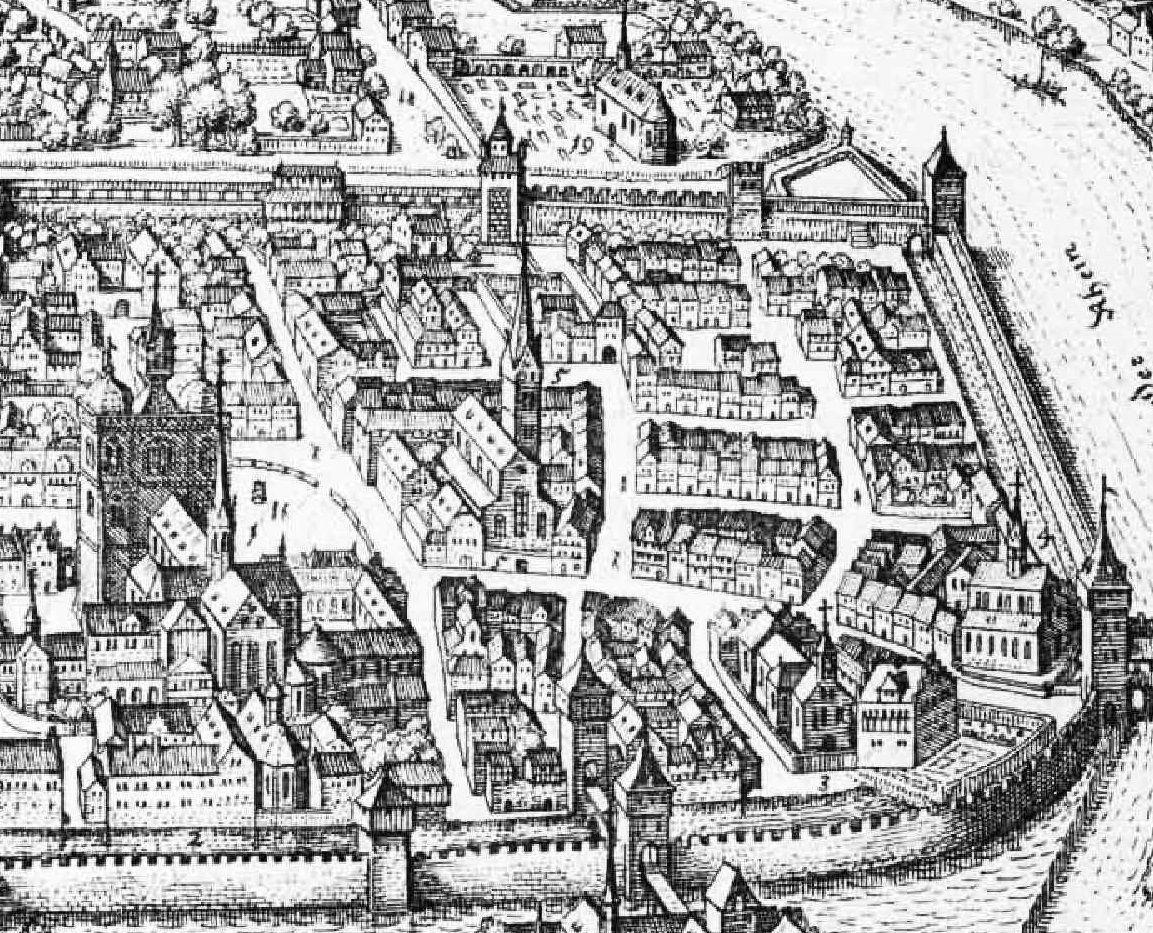
The Scots Monastery in Constance Merian 1643

The Saint James Scots Monastery in Constance, Germany was a Benedictine monastery, which, like the other Scots monasteries, was founded by Irish monks in the course of the second phase of the Hiberno-Scottish mission. It was situated to the west of the historic city wall near the banks of the Rhine on what is known today as Schottenstraße (Scots Street).

== History ==
=== Monastery ===
According to local tradition, the monastery was founded in 1142; however, the first documentary evidence of the monastery’s existence did not appear until 1220 onwards. There is also no mention of abbots until the late 1260s. It is likely that the monastery was founded by bishops (possibly in an effort to repopulate an old, abandoned monastery) and the first Irish monks probably came from the Saint James Monastery in Regensburg. The monastery, which was placed under the patronage of James the Great, was said by Gabriel Buzelin to have been founded in 653 and relocated to the Paradies suburb of the city in 701. Frequent documentary proof of the monastery’s existence would not emerge until the monastery became an abbey in 1245.

After economically challenging times and due to its small size, the Scots Monastery in Constance was promoted to the rank of pontifical monastery as part of the compulsory introduction of the Rule of Saint Benedict in 1245. After the middle of that century, it was influenced by the Scots Monastery in Würzburg. In around 1518 to 1520, the Saint James Monastery was transferred to Scottish monks, yet due to the influence of the reformation in Constance, the monastery was disbanded shortly thereafter and the buildings were demolished in 1529 and 1530.

=== Reuse of the grounds ===
Afterwards, the monastery grounds served as an urban cemetery from 1530 until 1870. The main cemetery in Constance was subsequently relocated to Petershausen (Constance). Today, the Saint James Scots chapel, founded in the year 1589, is located on the monastery grounds. The Alexander von Humboldt Gymnasium was opened in 1903. The Vincentius hospital was in operation from 1888 to 2018 and moved into a new building at the clinical centre in Constance. During the demolition works of the Vincentius hospital, bones from the former Scots cemetery were found, retrieved, subsequently examined and preserved in the archive of the State Office for Monument Preservation in Rastatt. The grounds of the Vincentius hospital are now being replaced by new buildings, the "Laubenhof", for accommodation, industry and offices.

== Literature ==
- Helmut Flachenecker: Schottenklöster. Irische Benediktinerkonvente im hochmittelalterlichen Deutschland (Quellen und Forschungen aus dem Gebiet der Geschichte N. S. 18), Paderborn u. a. 1995.
- Stefan Weber: Iren auf dem Kontinent. Das Leben des Marianus Scottus von Regensburg und die Anfänge der irischen «Schottenklöster», Heidelberg 2010.
