= Old Rhine Bridge (Konstanz) =

Bridge over the Rhine

Old Rhine Bridge at Konstanz Rheinbrücke Konstanz
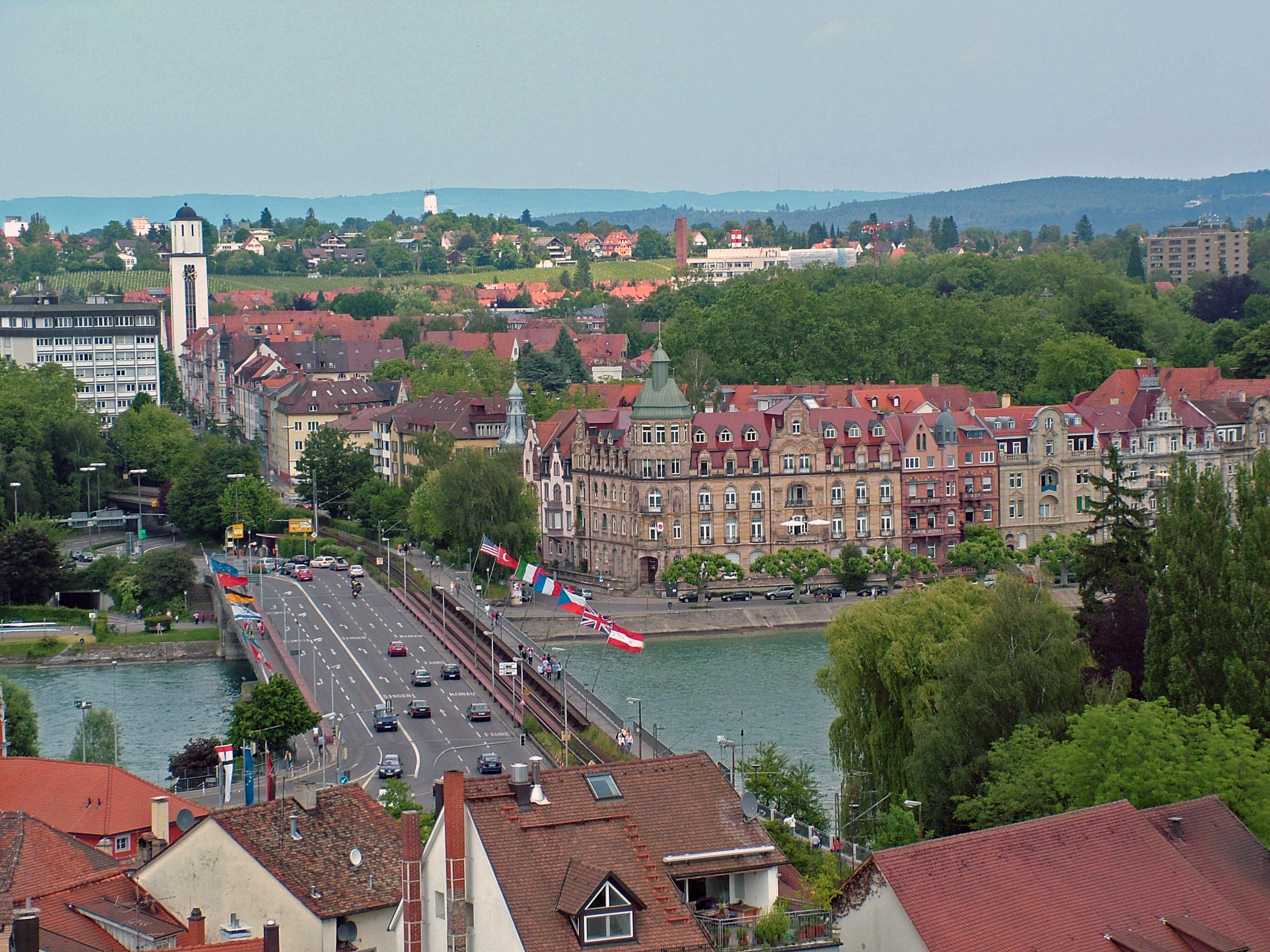
- Rhine Bridge at Konstanz
- Coordinates: 47°39′58″N 9°10′43″E
- Carries: Road and railway bridge, with bike and pedestrian lanes
- Crosses: Seerhein
- Locale: Konstanz

Characteristics
- Material: Steel beam bridge
- Total length: 127.8 metres (419 ft)
- Width: 26.95 metres (88.4 ft)
- Longest span: 42.6 metres (140 ft)
- No. of spans: 3

History
- Opened: 1938
- Inaugurated: 9 October 1938

The Old Rhine Bridge (German: Alte Rheinbrücke) at Konstanz spans the Seerhein. It is a combined road and railway bridge. In addition to one track of the High Rhine Railway at kilometer 413.5, it carries the Konzilstraße, the road that connects the borough of Petershausen with the city centre. The road bridge carries two lanes into the city center and three lanes in the other direction. Additionally, there is a bicycle lane in both directions on the left (as seen from the city centre) and a sidewalk on the right. In the 19th century, distance markers were placed along the Rhine; they start counting kilometers at this bridge.

== History ==
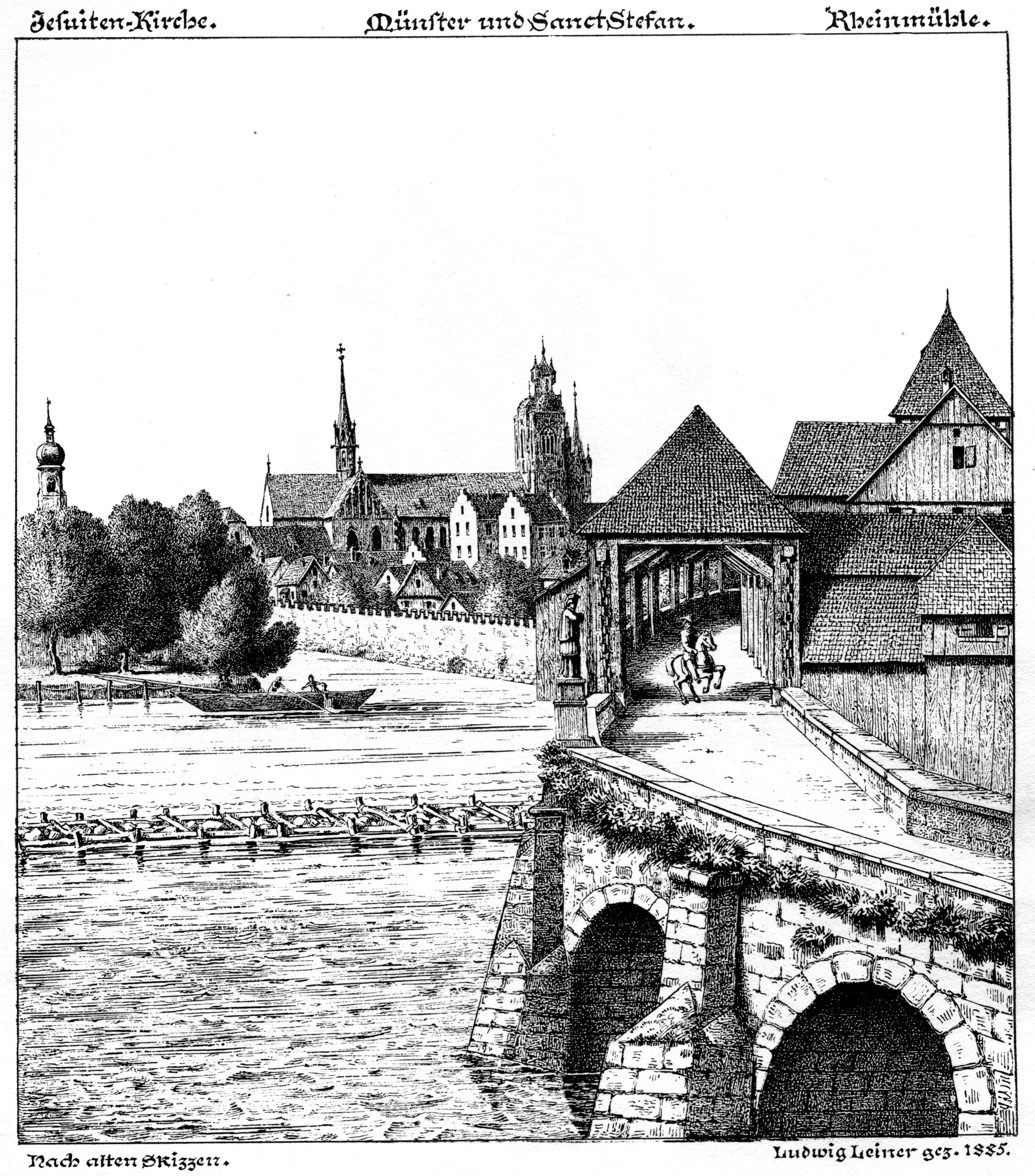
Ludwig Leiner: Old bridge over the Rhine in Konstanz, drawn in 1885 based on old sketches

The first bridge over the Seerhein was built by the Romans at Gottlieben. Since the medieval trade routes to northern Italy, France and Eastern Europe crossed in Constance, it is assumed that a wooden bridge existed below Constance before the 10th century. The construction of a wooden pile bridge in the flight of Rheingasse around 1200 CE is documented.

A mill was built into the bridge in 1418 or 1427 or 1437, because the bridge piles held back the water of the Upper lake and increased the 30 cm difference in water level between the Upper and Lower lake.

A lack of stability led to the bridge over the Rhine being demolished and reconstructed around 1540. The new bridge was completed in 1544. It consisted of a covered wooden bridge, based on double pillars, connected at both sides to a stone arch bridge and a draw bridge. A mill complex with a weir completed the structure. The wooden bridge superstructure, including the mills, were destroyed several times by fire and rebuilt, in at least 1548 and 1675. It was destroyed by fire for the last time in 1856. In 1857, the states surrounding Lake Constance decided not to rebuild the weir, because it was regarded as the cause of the extreme high water conditions around the Upper Lake. Until the new bridge was ready, a temporary wooden bridge allowed travellers to cross the Seerhein.

=== Bridge of 1860 ===
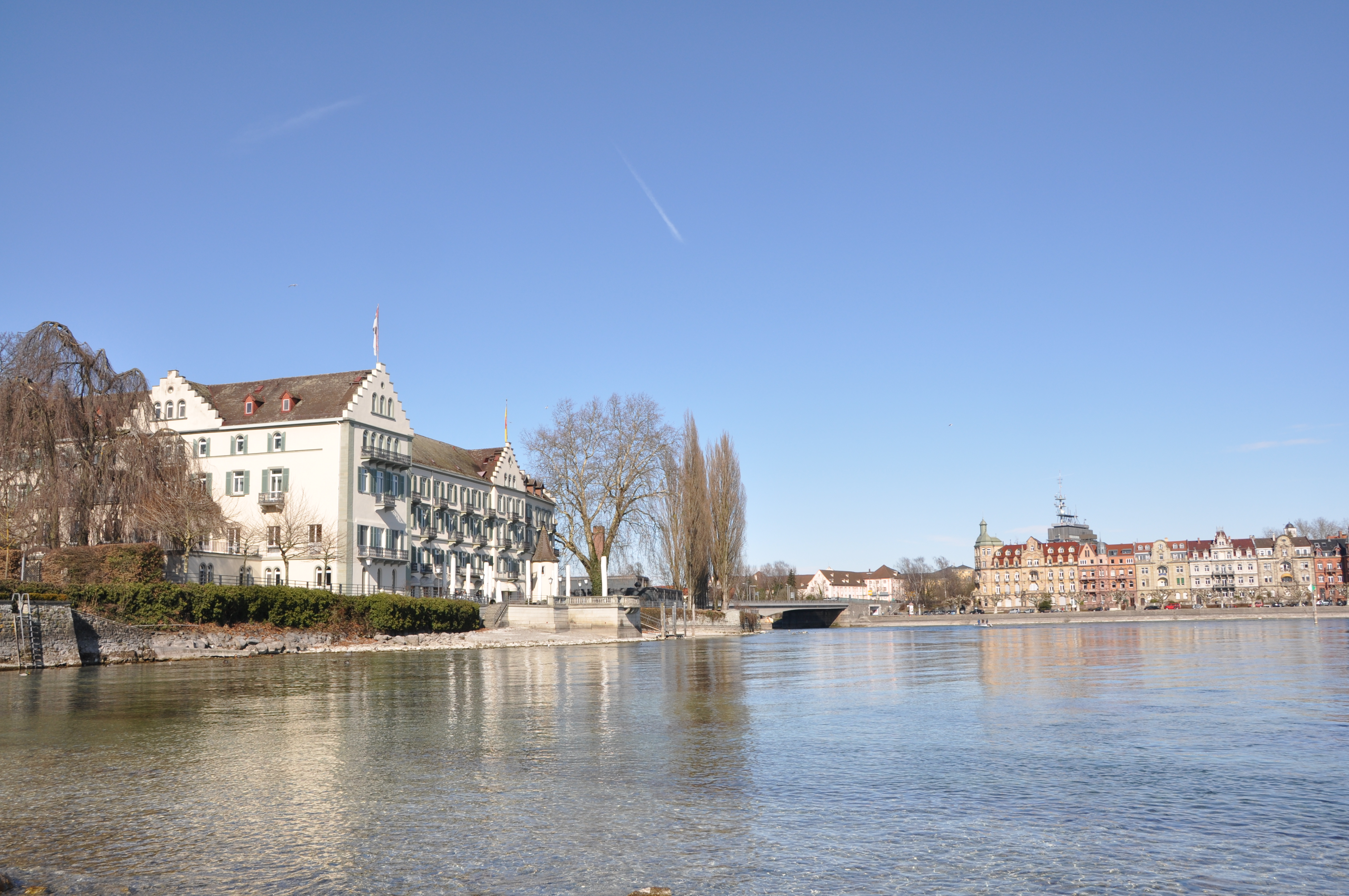
In the center of the picture the old Rhine bridge, on the left Dominicans Island

To ensure the largest possible flow cross-section of the Seerhein, the new bridge was built 60 m upriver. It had three long spans of 42.6 m each. In addition to the road, it carried the Baden Mainline. Construction Councillor Robert Gerwig from Baden designed the bridge and led the construction team. The Gebrüder Benckiser company from Pforzheim built the sub- and superstructures, starting in October 1858. The road bridge was opened to traffic on 3 December 1860. The double-track railway bridge entered service as the Baden Mainline was opened on 15 June 1863. Construction costs were 600000guilders. Due to increasing traffic loads of the trains, one railway track had to be shut down in 1873. At the time of Nazism, the structure was renamed Horst-Wessel-bridge.

=== Bridge of 1938 ===
To increase the efficiency of the Rhine bridge, the city of Konstanz decided in co-operation with the highway department of the day, and the Deutsche Reichsbahn, to fundamentally rebuild the bridge. The spans were unchanged, but the bridge was widened by about 50%. The Ed. Züblin company from Stuttgart was awarded the contract to build the substructure. Construction work began in November 1936. After a 190-meter-long temporary bridge was built downstream, the road bridge sections were taken apart, with the railway remaining in operation, albeit under restrictions. The superstructure of the old bridge, as well as the substructure, abutments and pillars were disassembled down to the water line. In the shelter of a sheet pile enclosed pit, timber piles with lengths of 18 to 20 m were driven into the river bottom, the abutments were extended downstream and the pillars were widened. New abutments were then built, using concrete with exposed brickwork from granite from Waldulm. The pillars were encased in concrete in the shelter of the sheet pile enclosed pit. The contract for the steel superstructure was awarded to the M.A.N. company from Mainz-Gustavsburg. The bridge sections were constructed in the factory in Mainz-Gustavsburg and transported by rail to the site where they were hoisted in place using a gantry crane and rivetted together. The new bridge was inaugurated on 9 October 1938.

=== 1957 widening ===
In the Second World War, the Rhine Bridge remained intact. In the years 1956-57 the roadway was widened to meet the increased traffic in the city. For this, the corridor was used that had been reserved for the second railway track in 1938. This was possible because the Bundesbahn had abandoned its plans to have two tracks connected to the Konstanz main railway station.

To further relieve the now over 70-year-old road bridge, a second bridge was built. This Schänzlebrücke was opened in 1980.

== Construction ==
=== 1860 bridge ===
The arch bridge was in total 17.85 m wide. It carried two railroad tracks and a 5.4 m wide road on the downstream side, plus sidewalks on both sides. The 127.8 m long structure had three spans of 42.6 m each. The superstructure consisted of four solid-walled, wrought-iron arched girders across each span. Statues of Bishops Konrad and Gebhard of Constance and Duke Berthold, Duke of Zähringen and Grand Duke Leopold stood on the four pillars. The latter two were sculpted by Hans Baur.

=== 1938 bridge ===
The total length of the new bridge is again 127.8 m, but this one is 26.95 m wide. The roadway was widened to 10.0 m. This bridge has separate superstructures for the road, the railway and the non-motorized lanes. The piers and abutments for the railway bridge were designed to carry two single-track superstructures, of which only the eastern one has been implemented. Viewed in the downstream direction, the first superstructure is the pedestrian walkway, the second is the railway bridge, then comes a four-lane road bridge, with a console carrying a bike path mounted on the western carrier.

In the longitudinal direction, the spans consist of continuous beams. Each bridge had two steel girders with variable height and a horizontal top flange design, which was located above the roadway. The bottom flange rests on the pillars and curves with a radius of about 100 m.

In 1957, a third major carrier was inserted in the gap between the rail and road bridges. It bears the eastern road bridge deck.

== See also ==
- List of bridges over the Rhine
