= Seerhein =

River in Germany and between Germany and Switzerland

Coordinates: 47.67°N 9.17°E

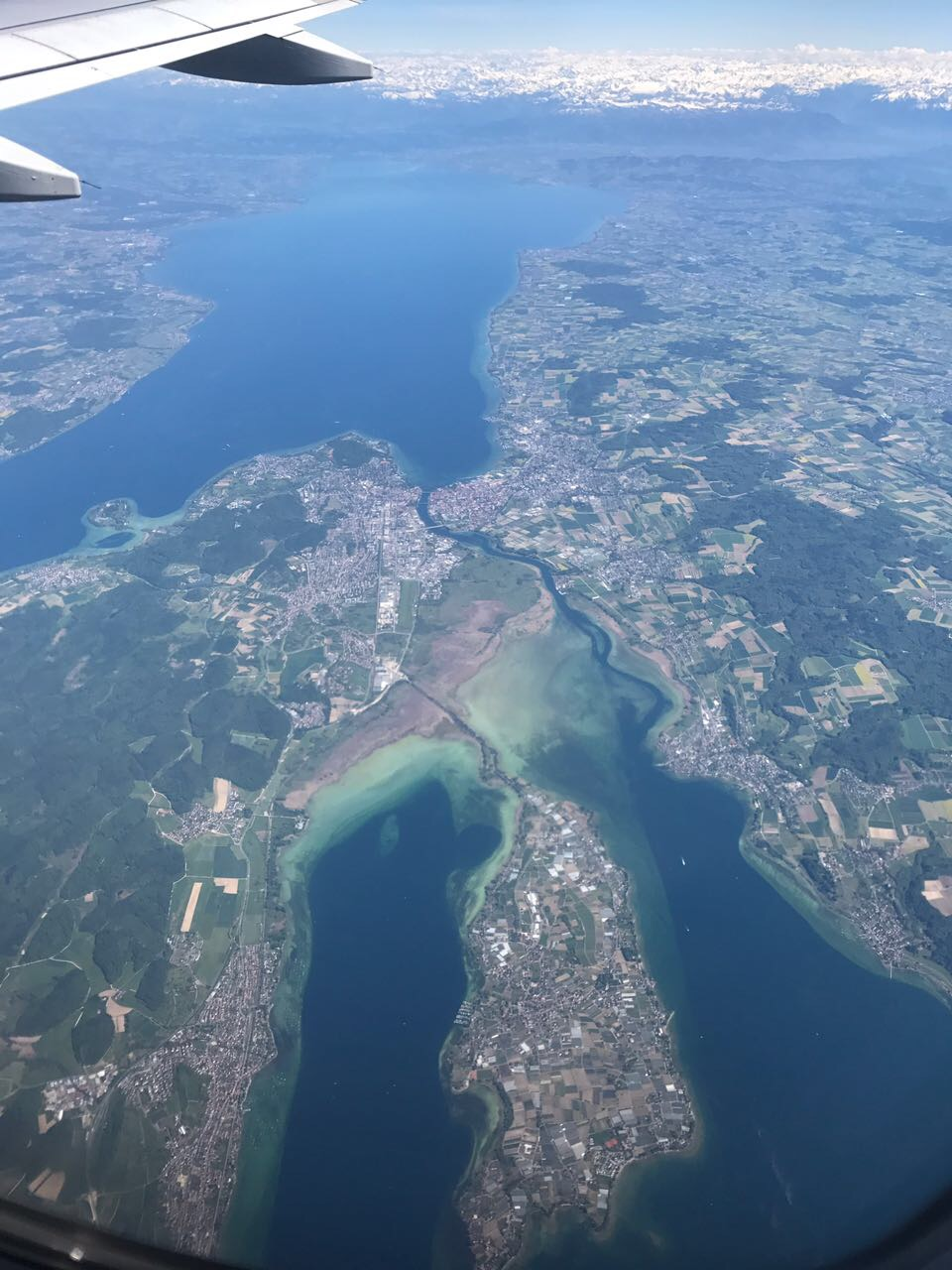
- Seerhein between Obersee (above) and Untersee (below)

Location
- Country: Germany
- State: Baden-Württemberg (Konstanz)
- Country: Switzerland
- Canton: Thurgau (Kreuzlingen)

Physical characteristics
- Source
  - location: Upper Lake Constance (Obersee) in Konstanz
- Mouth
  - location: Lower Lake Constance (Untersee) west of Gottlieben
- Length: 4.3 km (2.7 mi)

Basin features
- Tributaries
  - left: Grenzbach, Dorfbach

The Seerhein (lit. 'Rhine of the lake(s)'; cf. Rheinsee) is a river about 4.3 km (2.7 mi) long, in the basin of Lake Constance (German: Bodensee). It is the outflow of the Upper Lake Constance and the main tributary of the Lower Lake Constance. The water level of the Lower Lake is about 30 cm (12 in) below the level of the Upper Lake. It is considered part of the river Rhine, which flows into Lake Constance as the Alpine Rhine and flows out of the Lower Lake as the High Rhine.

The Seerhein arose after the last ice age (the Würm glaciation, about 9650 BCE). Some time after this period, the water level of Lake Constance gradually dropped by about ten metres and the shallow parts fell dry. Some parts of the Seerhein still have a lake-like character.

The border between Germany and Switzerland runs along the river within its lower stretch; the German city of Konstanz (Constance), the largest community on the river, is situated on both sides of the upper part of the Seerhein.

== Location ==
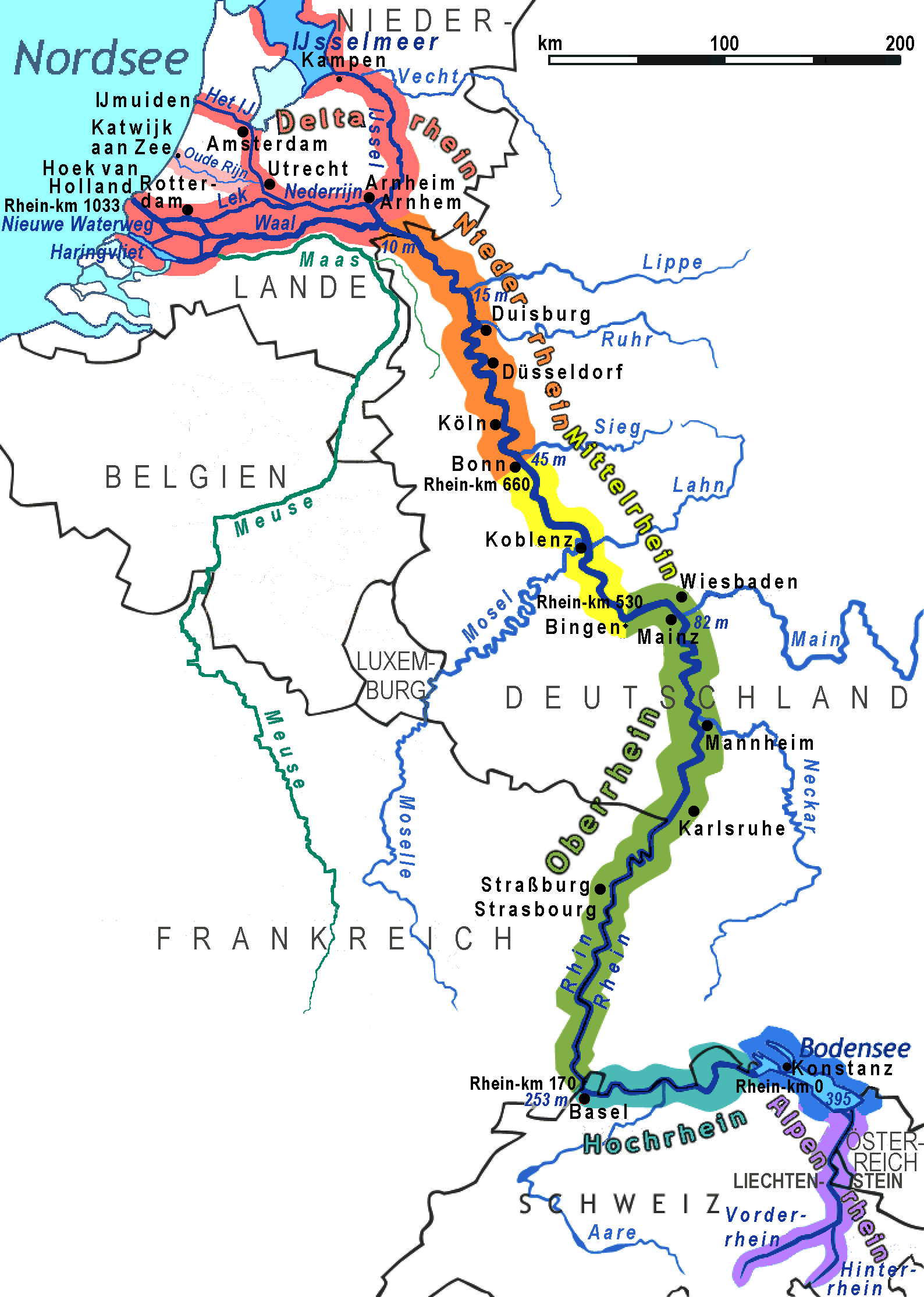
Sections of the Rhine: Rhine–Meuse–Scheldt delta Lower Rhine Middle Rhine Upper Rhine High Rhine Lake Constance (Untersee, Seerhein, Obersee) Alpine Rhine, Vorderrhein, Hinterrhein Rhine sources

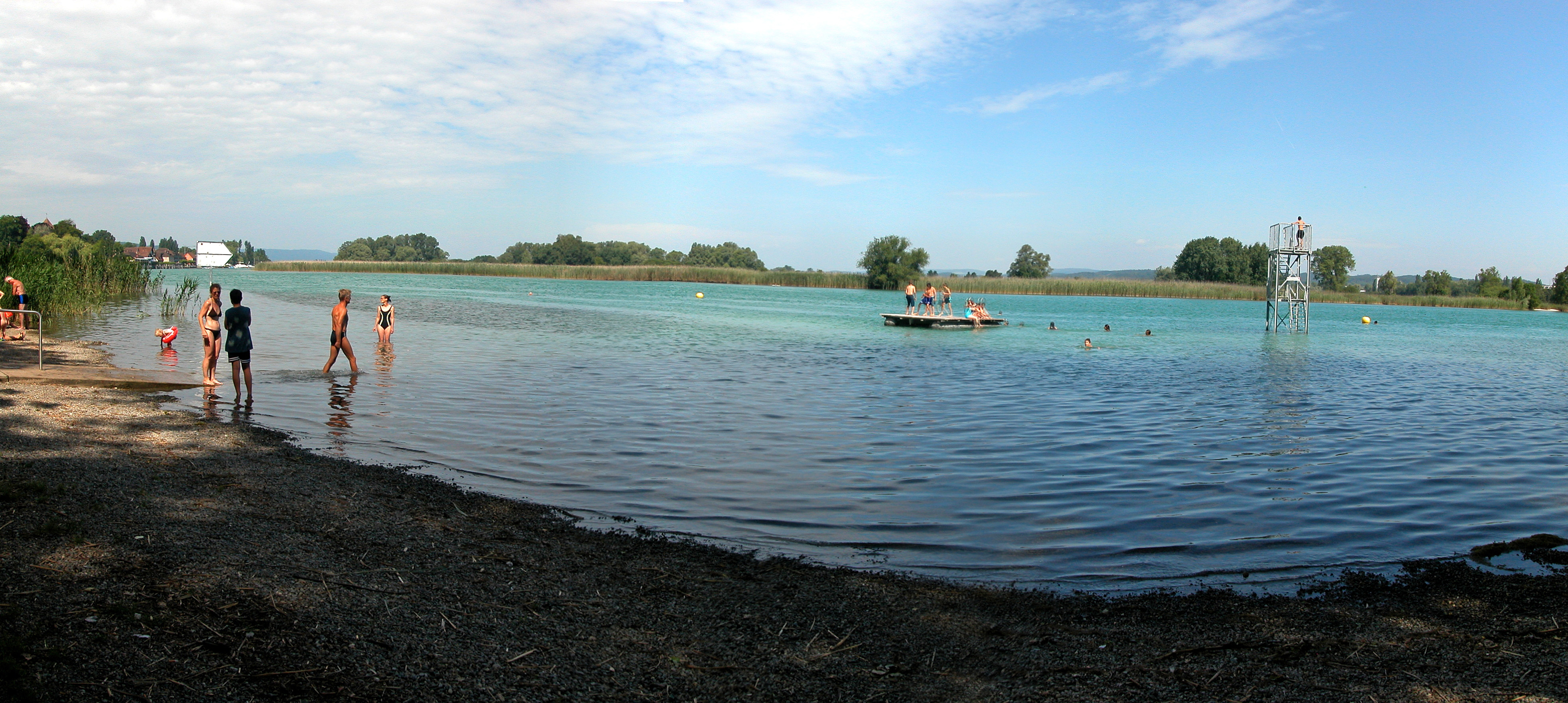
The Lake Rhine (Seerhein) near Gottlieben

=== General ===
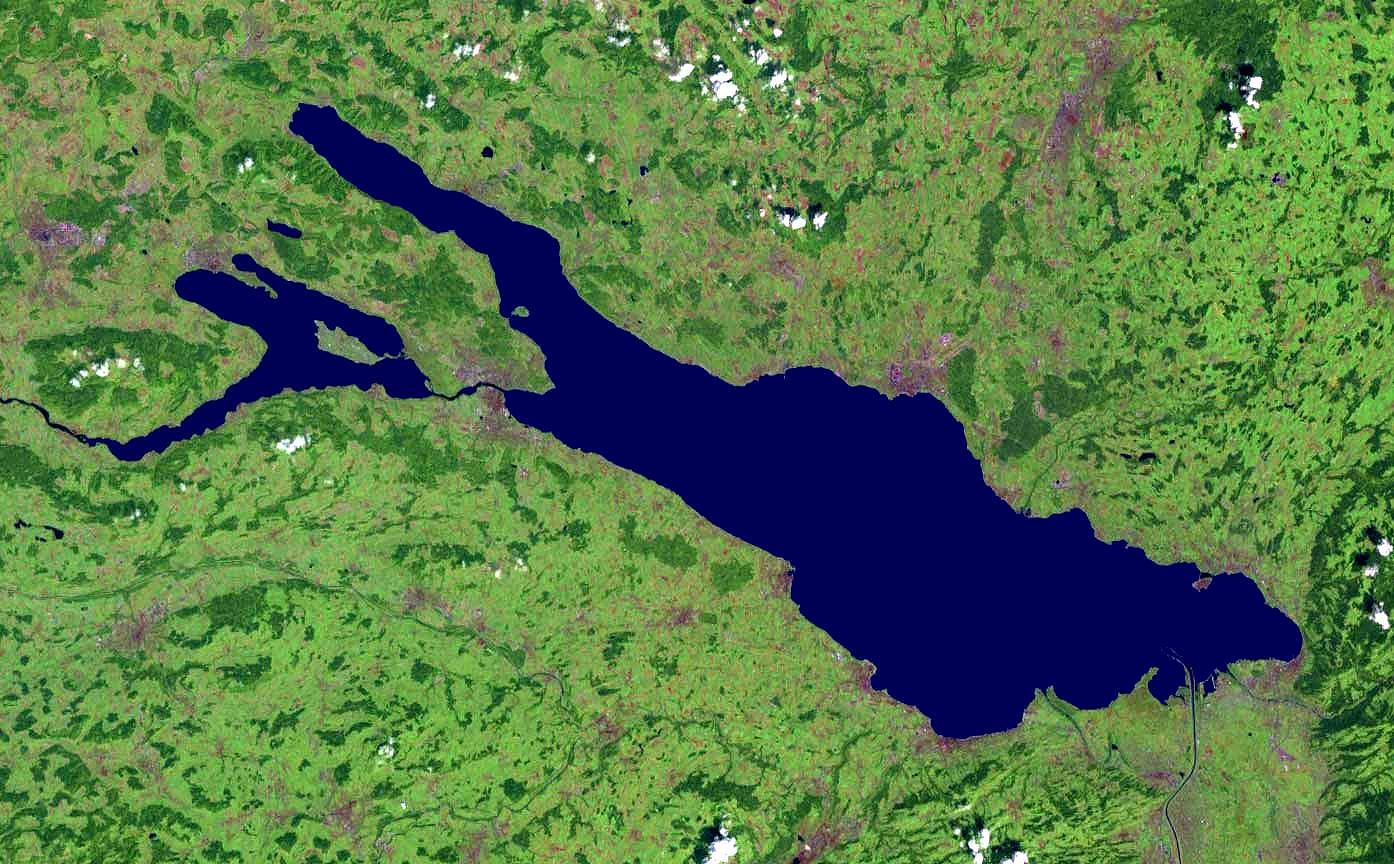
Satellite image of the Lake Constance Basin. Between the larger Upper Lake Constance and the smaller Lower Lake Constance, the Seerhein can be seen.

The Seerhein extends over a length of 4.3 km (2.7 mi) from the old bridge and Dominicans Island across the Rhine in Constance in the east to the island of Triboldingerbohl in the west. Narrow side channels extend between this island, the islands of Mittler and Langbohl and the Wollmatinger Ried. The Seerhein is between 100 m (330 ft) and 500 m (1,600 ft) wide and between 7 m (23 ft) and 25 m (82 ft) deep. About halfway along the river, there is an unnamed, shallow, widening, which looks a bit like a small lake. The Seerhein has two creeks as tributaries, both on the left side: the Dorfbach near Gottlieben and the Grenzbach ("Border Brook") on the western city limits of Constance.

Most of the river, including the entire north shore and the eastern part of the southern shore, is located on German territory. On the western two kilometers, the border between Germany and Switzerland runs through the middle of the river. On the Swiss side the municipalities of Tägerwilen and Gottlieben border the river; the German side the city of Constance and the Landkreis of municipality of Reichenau. The Swiss city of Kreuzlingen is considered part of the agglomeration centered on Constance. On the South bank, we find the old city center of Constance and the former villages of Paradies; the densely populated area between these centers was built up in the 19th and 20th centuries. On the Swiss part of the South bank, we find the villages of Gottlieben and Tägermoos. Tägermoos is politically in the Swiss municipality of Tägerwilen, but the City of Constance participates in its administration. On the North bank, there are Petershausen and Stromeyersdorf; both are now districts of Constance. Also found on the North bank is "Zugwiesen", an exclave of the municipality of Reichenau.

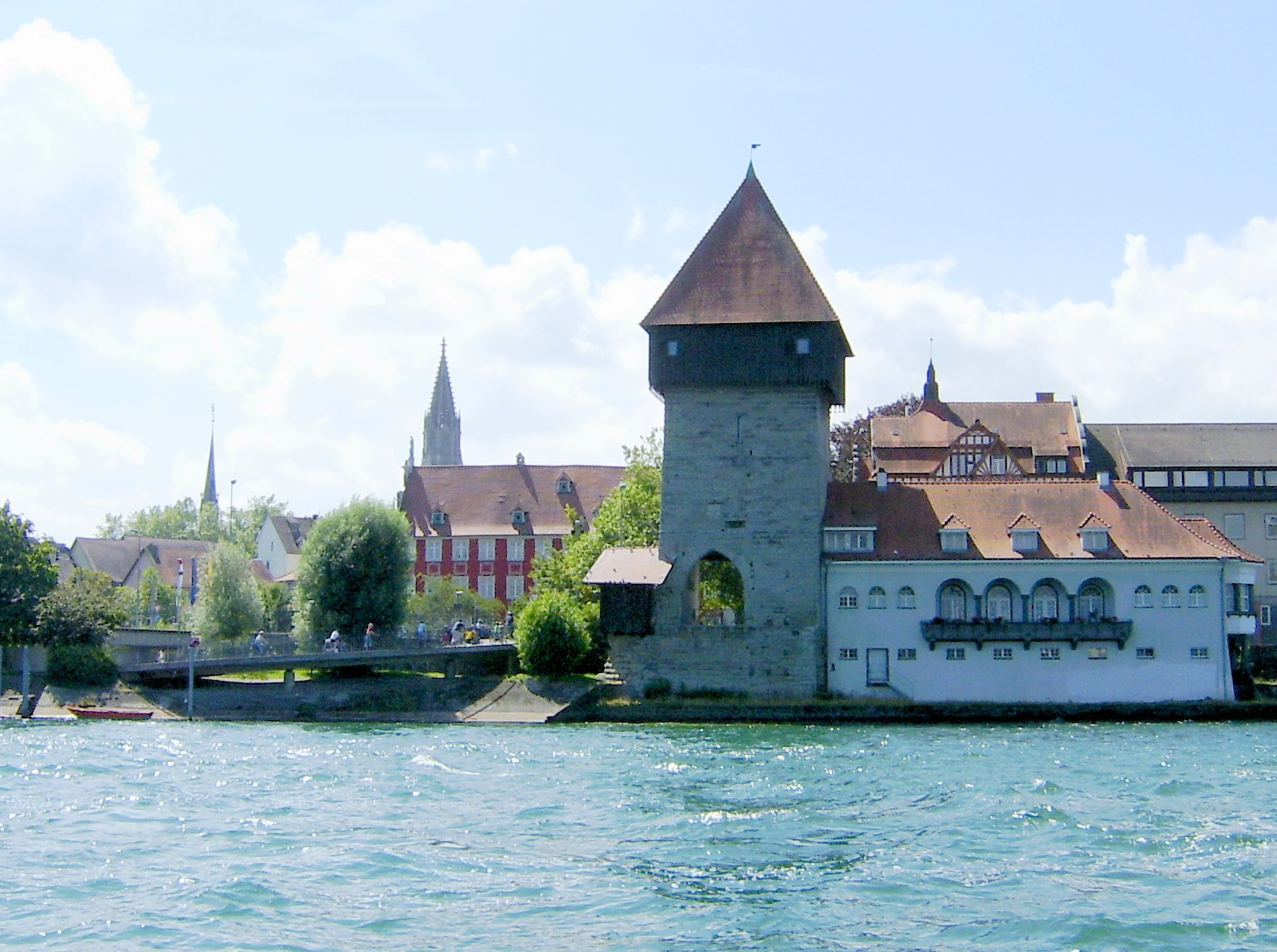
The Rhine Gate Tower. The old bridge across the Rhine began at this gate.

The embankments in the urban area of Constance are sometimes used to moor boats. The North bank has experienced very active construction in recent years. Industrial estates were demolished and replaced by residential estates, with parks along the river. The inner city "Rhine Beach" is also situated on the North bank. Outside the city, the banks are unimproved. There are two places where swimming is permitted: the "Konstanzer Kuhhorn" in Tägermoos and the pool in Tägerwilen. The Western part of the North bank (known as the "Wollmatinger Ried") is swampy and overgrown with cane, and the same holds for the Swiss bank West of Gottlieben. Due to their size and tranquility, these marshlands are of major ecological importance.

Historically interesting buildings in the Seerhein area are remains of the fortifications of Constance (Rhine Gate Tower and Powder Tower), the Petershausen Abbey, the Gottlieben Castle and former factories in Stromeyersdorf.

=== Seerhein valley ===
The Seerhein flows through a depression which is known as Seetal (English: Lake Valley) or Konstanzer Niederung (English: Constance Depression). This valley is bordered on the south by the Seerücken (English: Lake Ridge) and to the north from the hill country of the Bodanrück peninsula.

The name Konstanzer Niederung is a contribution by Benting. It derives from his description of the Natural regions of Germany, in which the Niederung appeared as a natural subunit.

The Swiss call the depression Seetal ("Lake Valley"). This name is used in names like Schulzentrum Seetal ("Seetal School'), Pumpwerk Seetal ("Seetal Pumping Station"), Seetalstrasse ("Seetal Street"), all found in Kreuzlingen. In a Swiss list of regions, Schilter included the Seetal in the Uferlandschaft ("River Bank Area"), which stretches all the way to Romanshorn.

== Transport ==
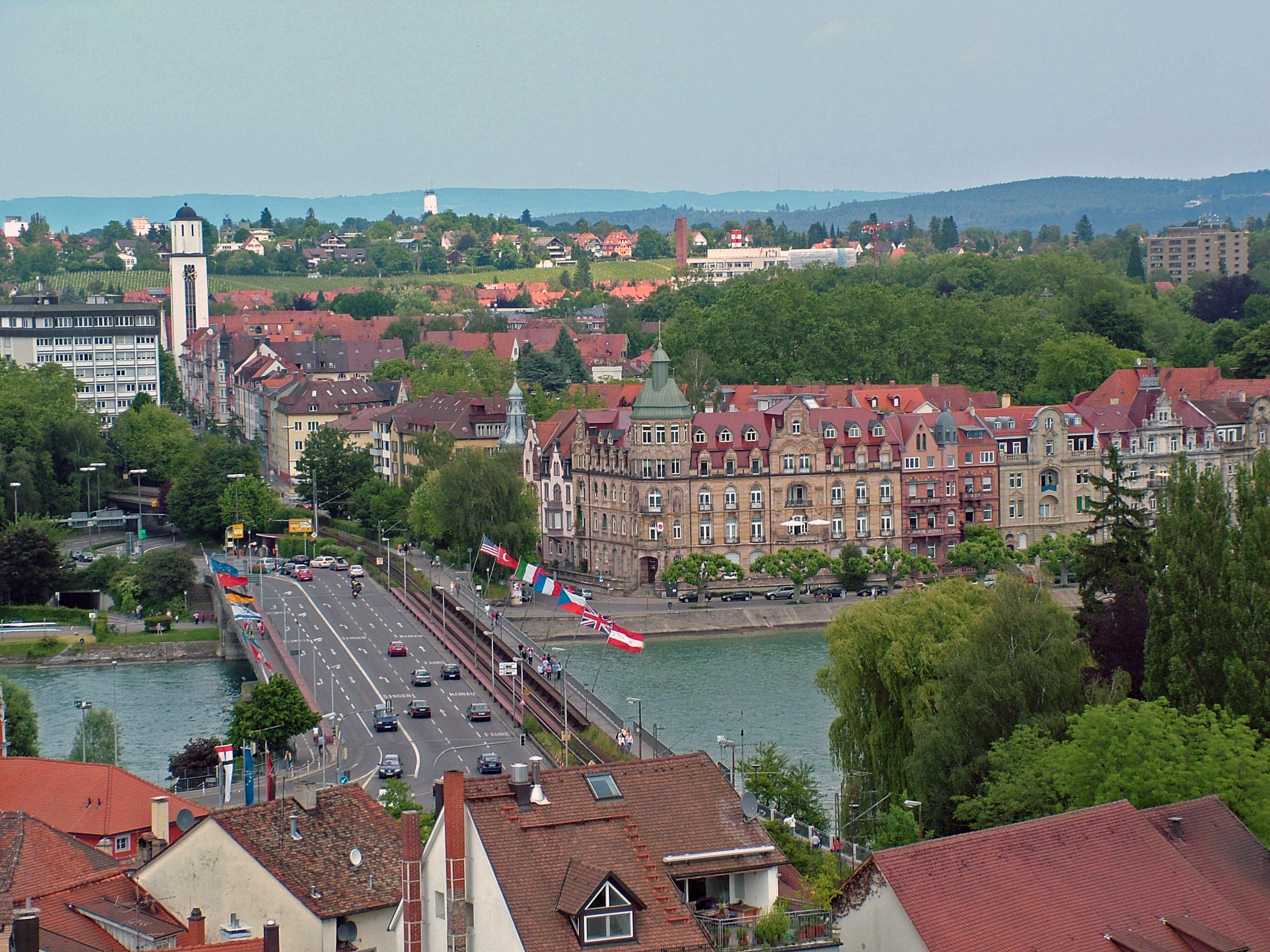
View from Constance Minster tower to the beginning of the Seerhein Konstanz on the old bridge over the Rhine

The Seerhein is navigable and is used primarily by the pleasure boats of the Schweizerische Schifffahrtsgesellschaft Untersee und Rhein (lit. 'Swiss Shipping Company Untersee and Rhine'), which operates between Schaffhausen and Kreuzlingen. There is a landing stage at Gottlieben.

There are three bridges across the Seerhein, all on the upper part of the river. Furthest East is the Old Rhine Bridge in Constance, near the bottleneck of the terminal moraine (see below). The current bridge was constructed in 1957, but precursors have existed since late antiquity. The bridge carries a road and railway line. A little to the West, the Seerheinbrücke, a pedestrian and cycle bridge, was built in 1991. At the Western edge of Contance, the Schänzlebrücke crosses the river. It is part of the German Federal Highway 33, which turns in to Highway A7 at the border. To the south, the Seerhein is followed by the Lake Line.

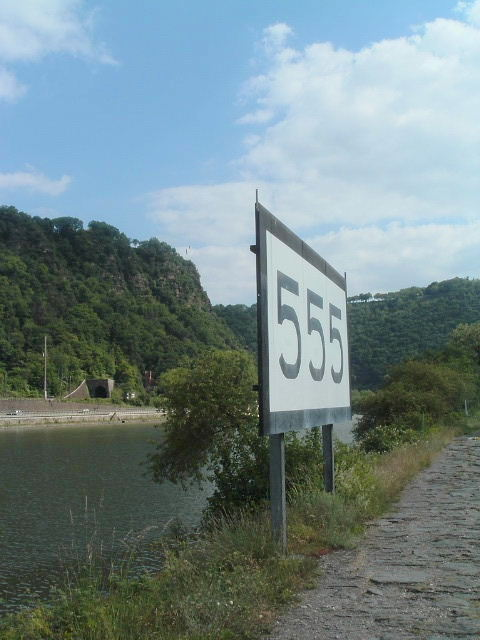
The 555 km marker, downstream of the Loreley

There used to be several ferries, one to the East of the present cycle bridge, and one between Paradies and Stromeyersdorf. In the 19th century, distance markers where placed along the Rhine; they start counting Kilometres at the Old Bridge in Constance.

== Paleogeographic Development ==
The entire landscape of the Seerhein and its environment is in the range of Molasse basin, which was formed during the Upper Miocene about 30 million years ago. In the next 7 million years (until now) the sedimentation exceeded the erosion. During this timeframe, the present landscape was formed. During the Pliocene and Pleistocene, erosion was dominated by the Aare and Danube, later by the High Rhine. Rivers and glaciers created furrows and basins.

The paleogeographic development of the Seerhein is closely connected to that of the valley through which it flows. This valley was created by the early High Rhine and the Rhine glacier and filled by different lake deposits. The entire Lake basin is characterized by the alternation of the wide basin, narrow cross valleys and mountainous landscapes. The lowlands surrounding the Seerhein are largely the result of siltation and is one of the basin landscapes; the neighbouring hill ranges Bodanrück and Seerücken are glacial molasses highlands.

A decisive step in the formation of today's Seerhein and Lake Constance area took place with the deflection of the Alpine Rhine from the Danube to the Aar during Günz ice age. On the line Lake Constance-Seerhein-High Rhine enhanced vertical erosion followed, while the advancing Rhine glacier prepared today's Lake basin.

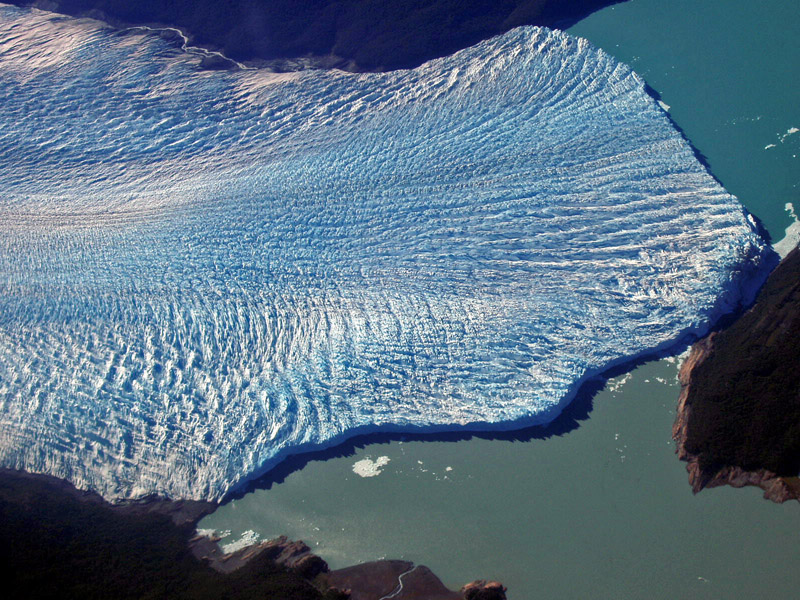
Glacier with Ice Lake (Perito Moreno Glacier, Argentina)

The retreat of the Rhine glacier (at the end of the Würm ice age) occurred as a number of melting and stationary phases, which are conventionally divided into nine stages. Stage 9, the "Constance" stage, begins with the edge of the ice at a standstill near Constance. The ice edge east of the glacier was along a line from the Lake Überlingen via the eastern tip of Bodanrück, through Constance and Kreuzlingen to the northern end of the Seerücken.

Early in the Constance stage, a proglacial lake formed in the area of today's Seerhein basin and to the west of it. In this lake, extensive silty calcareous, glacilimnic layers were deposited. These appear on the surface in some places on the edge of the valley. After the Ice lake disappeared, a terminal moraine was formed, which later turned out to be important for the course of human settlement (see below). Initially, the melt water from the Lake Überlingen basin flowed through Staringen Valley; later it flowed through the Allmannsdorf melt water channel in the area of today's Seerhein depression. A melt period followed, in which all ice in the Konstanzer Trichter and Obersee melted.

After the end of the Würm Ice Age (about 9650 BC) the water level of Lake Constance was at about 405 m above the current sea level, or about 10 metres above the present level. Back then, the Seerhein valley was submerged and Lake Constance was a single lake. Deep erosion of the Rhine then lowered the lake to its current level (about 395 m). The Seerhein valley fell dry; the Upper and Lower were Lake separated, and the Seerhein emerged as the connection between the two lakes. The course of the present Seerhein may well correspond to the location of the current in the days when Lake Constance was a single lake. The former extent of the lake is indicated by typical lake deposits; in the Seerhein valley, such deposits are found all over the valley floor. These lake sediments usually have a thickness of 0.2 to 2 metres, near the Seerhein up to 13 metres. In the western part of today's depression, the surf of the lake formed many beach ridges perpendicular to the main wind direction (southwest); ridges in the Wollmatinger Ried are still well preserved. Besides the described main elements (Würm moraine, Ice Lake sediments, Lake deposits, including the beach ridges), Pleistocene talus and Holocene alluvial fan are found in Seerhein basin.

== History ==
The end moraines in the Constance depression were formed along the edge of the ice during the Constance stage (see above). In the area of the old town of Constance, we find a moraine surrounded by Lake deposits. The section of the moraine in Kreuzlingen, however, is surrounded predominantly by Pleistocene talus. Sections of the end moraine are found further north east and south east, in the area of the Bodanrück and Seerücken, respectively. Sections od end moraine connecting these to the Constance section may have been eroded away, or they may never have existed due to water movement during the Constance stage.

Originally, most of the basin floor was swampy or even rather wet. The moraines, however, were suitable for human settlement. The moraine of Constance has been the location of several prehistoric and early historic settlement, among them a Roman predecessor of Constance. Large parts of today's old town of Constance are on the terminal moraine, and the north–south direction of the old town is due to the direction of the moraine. By contract, Stadelhofen, the southernmost town of the Constance area, was built on the former lake bed. In Kreuzlingen, the moraine extends along the Hauptstrasse ("Main Street"), roughly from the border to the intersection with Remisbergstrasse. Both the old and the new location of the monastery at Kreuzlingen are in the area of the moraine.

In the context of the two-part Lake Constance, the Seerhein present a suitable point to construct a bridge or a ferry and to found a port town. The best place to cross the river was probably the terminal moraine bottleneck at the beginning of the Seerhein. Celtic, Roman and Alemannic, the Diocese of Constance and the Imperial Free City Constance tried to use this strategic position.

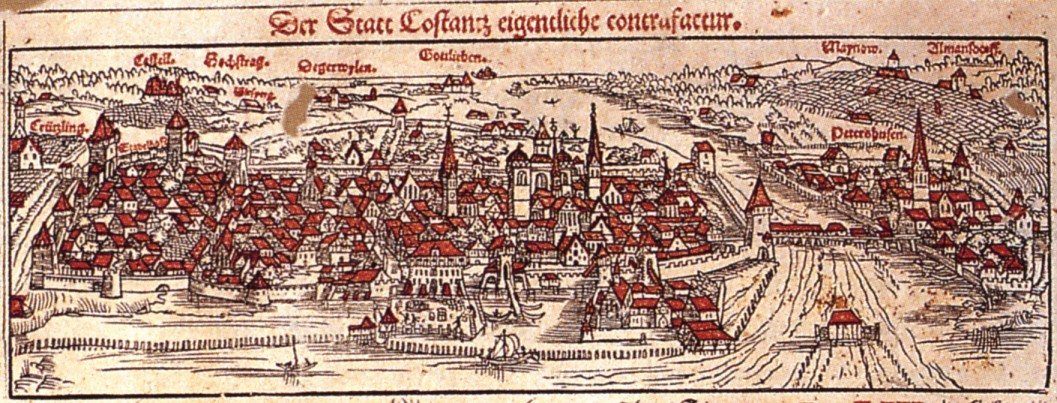
View from the lake of medieval Constance (woodcut of 1553); the Seerhein is on the right

In the ancient world, the Seerhein marked the northern boundary of the Roman Empire for a while. In the early Middle Ages, he was the boundary between the legislative areas of Thurgau and Hegau and the northern boundary of the City of Constance. Petershausen, on the north bank opposite Constance, was founded in 983 and later became a suburb, before it was annexed by the city. The monastery was founded on the opposite bank of the Seerhien, by analogy with St. Peter's basilica in Rome, with was built on the "other" side of the Tiber.

During the Middle Ages, the river bank was fortified by a city wall with several towers, which was partially built on the river. It was connected to the north bank by a stone bridge. There was a grain mill on the bridge, driven by the river. The north banks were not improved, until the area was developed for industrial uses in the 19th century.

== Water miracles of Constance ==
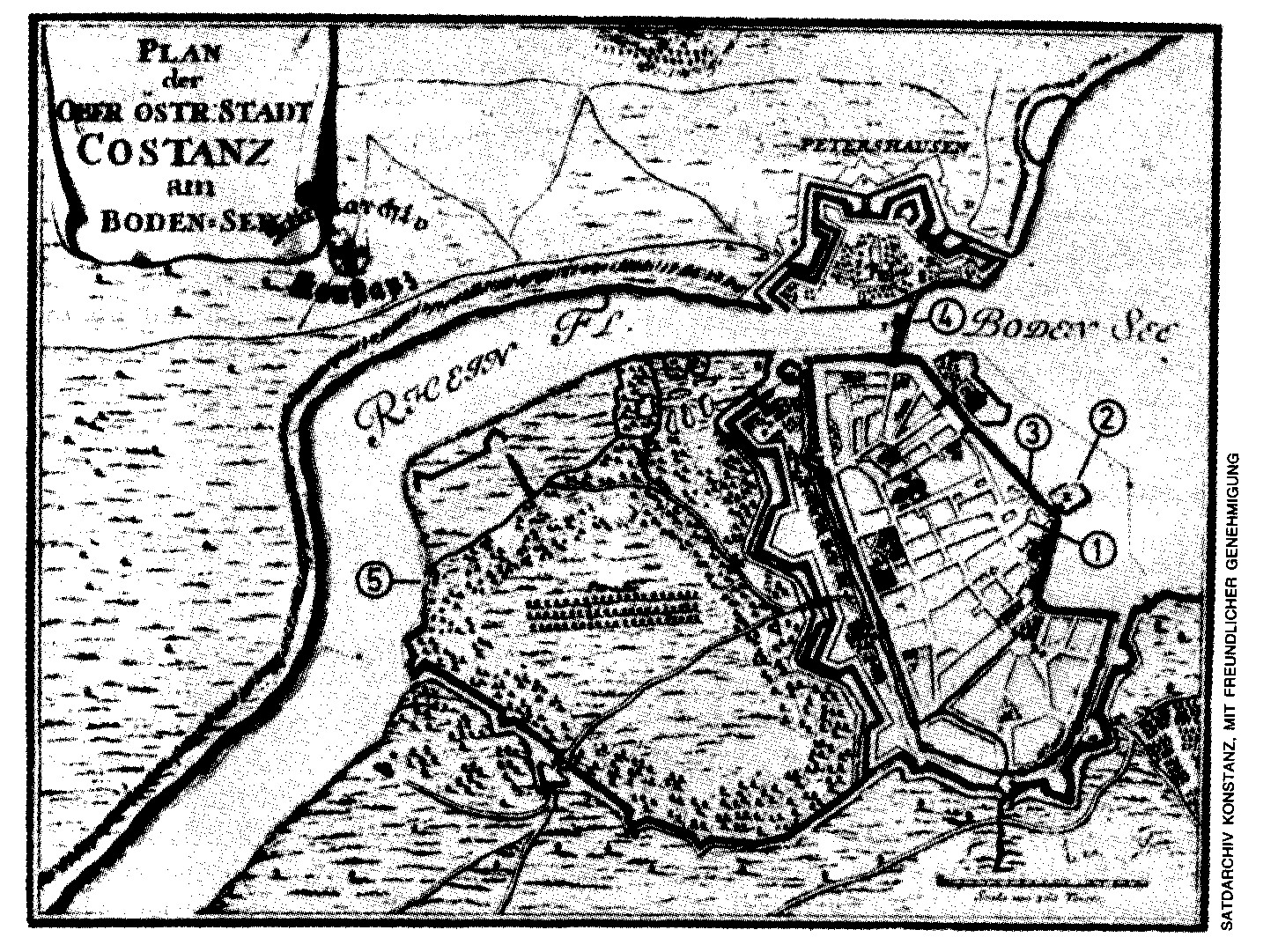
Map of the Seerhein with observatories of the "water miracle"

On 23 February 1549 the "water miracle of Constance" is reported to have happened: the level of the Seerhein rose and fell over several hours at intervals of about a quarter of an hour by an ell, more than half a meter. Fishermen on the Lower Lake reported that the water of the Rhine appeared to flow backwards. Today, this event can be explained scientifically: Certain wind conditions induce waves at the natural frequency of the upper and lower lake. This creates a seiche, i.e. standing wave, in which the entire lake resonates at its natural frequency. As it happens, Constance is close to an anti-node in this wave, making the effect especially visible.

== See also ==
- List of rivers of Germany
- List of rivers of Switzerland

== Sources ==
- Benzing, Alfred (1964): Natural regions on sheet 186: Constance, Bad Godesberg 1964 (Natural regions of Germany, Geographical Map 1:200,000)
- Shields, René Ch. (1977): Attempt at a landscape classification and typology of Switzerland, Zurich, 1977
- Schreiner, Albert (1992), Explanation of the sheet Hegau and Western Lake Constance, third edition, Freiburg / Stuttgart 1992 (1:50,000 Geological Map of Baden-Württemberg)
