= Tägermoos =

- Coat of arms

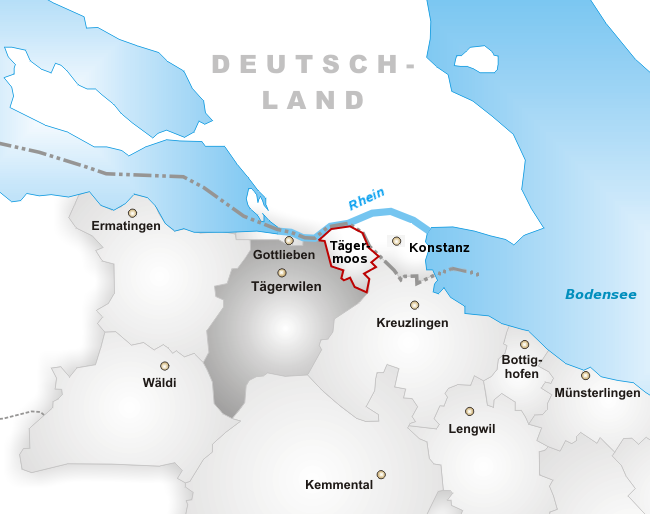

- Location within Switzerland
- Coordinates: 47.66°N 9.15°E
- Country: Switzerland
- Canton: Thurgau
- Region: Kreuzlingen
- Municipality: Tägerwilen

Area
  - Total: 1.541401 km^{2} (0.595138 sq mi)
- Elevation: 397 m (1,302 ft)

Population (26 May 2009)
  - Total: 20
  - Density: 13/km^{2} (34/sq mi)
- Website: taegerwilen.ch

The Tägermoos is an area of 1.54 km^{2} (380 acres) in Thurgau, Switzerland, wedged between the outskirts of the German city of Constance and the core village of the Swiss municipality of Tägerwilen. It lies on the south bank of the Seerhein. In the east, it borders the district Paradies of Constance. In the south-east, it borders the district Emmishofen of the municipality of Kreuzlingen.

The remarkable status of Tägermoos was fixed in 1831 by a treaty which is still in force today. Under this treaty, the area is part of Switzerland at the state level and part of the Swiss municipality of Tägerwilen. However, certain administrative tasks are exercised by the German city of Constance, in accordance with Thurgau municipal law. Other tasks are exercised by the authorities of Tägerwilen. In particular, land survey is the responsibility of Constance, making Tägermoos a Gemarkung of the city of Constance.

The City of Constance legally owns about two-thirds of the land; the rest is held by Swiss authorities and private citizens. It was once a marshy commons, but has since been drained and is now mostly used for agriculture, primarily vegetable production and allotments. At the Eastern edge, there are two border crossings, the larger Tägermoos crossing and the smaller Gottlieber Zoll.

== History ==
=== Middle Ages and Early Modern Period ===
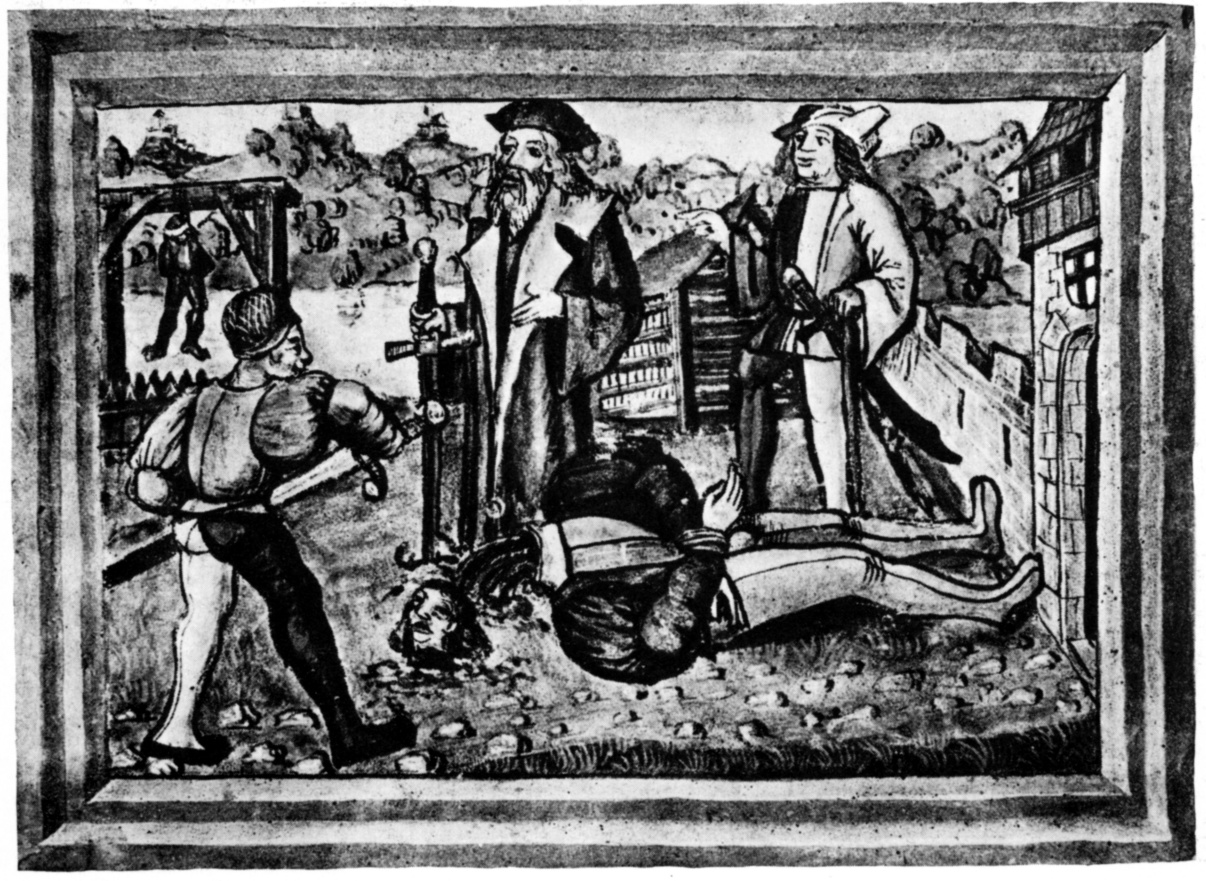
Decapitation at the gallows in Tägermoos in 1506; in the background the Brickyard (from the Lucerne Chronicle of Diebold Schilling the Younger, 1513)

During the Early Middle Ages, the Tägermoos belonged to the possession in Thurgau of the Diocese of Constance, the so-called Bischofshöri. Bishop Hermann I of Arbon (term 1138–1165), donated the land to the Scots Abbey St. James in Paradies, which had been founded in 1142. In 1293, the City Council of Constance purchased the Tägermoos from the Abbey, for use as a commons. It was used for cattle essentially unchanged from the 13th century until its privatisation in 1800.

Outside the Constance city walls, a gallows was built in 1384. It was used by the court in Constance until it was demolished in 1833. In 1466 a brickyard was constructed, which was later known as the Ziegelhof ("brick court").

In 1417, the Imperial Free City of Constance acquired the jurisdiction over the county of Thurgau as a pledge. In 1460, Constance lost the low justice over most of the Thurgau when the Old Swiss Confederacy conquered the area; Constance only retained low justice over the bailiwicks of Eggen, Raitigericht and Altnau. During the Swabian War of 1499, high justice in the Thurgau was lost to the court in Frauenfeld. During the 14th Century, the City of Constance managed to incorporate the neighbouring village of Paradies (at the time known as Eggenhusen). However, attempts to incorporate the Tägermoos failed.

During the Thirty Years' War, a fortress with a moat were constructed in Paradies, as a second line of defence against attacks from the southern side of the Rhine. The Tägermoos itself lay outside this ring, which was meant to protect the settlements of Paradies and the Brühl, the urban festival grounds, against enemy attacks. The Heerstraße ("army road") led from the "Outer Paradies Gate" through the Tägermoos to Ermatingen.

=== Helvetization and privatization around 1800 ===
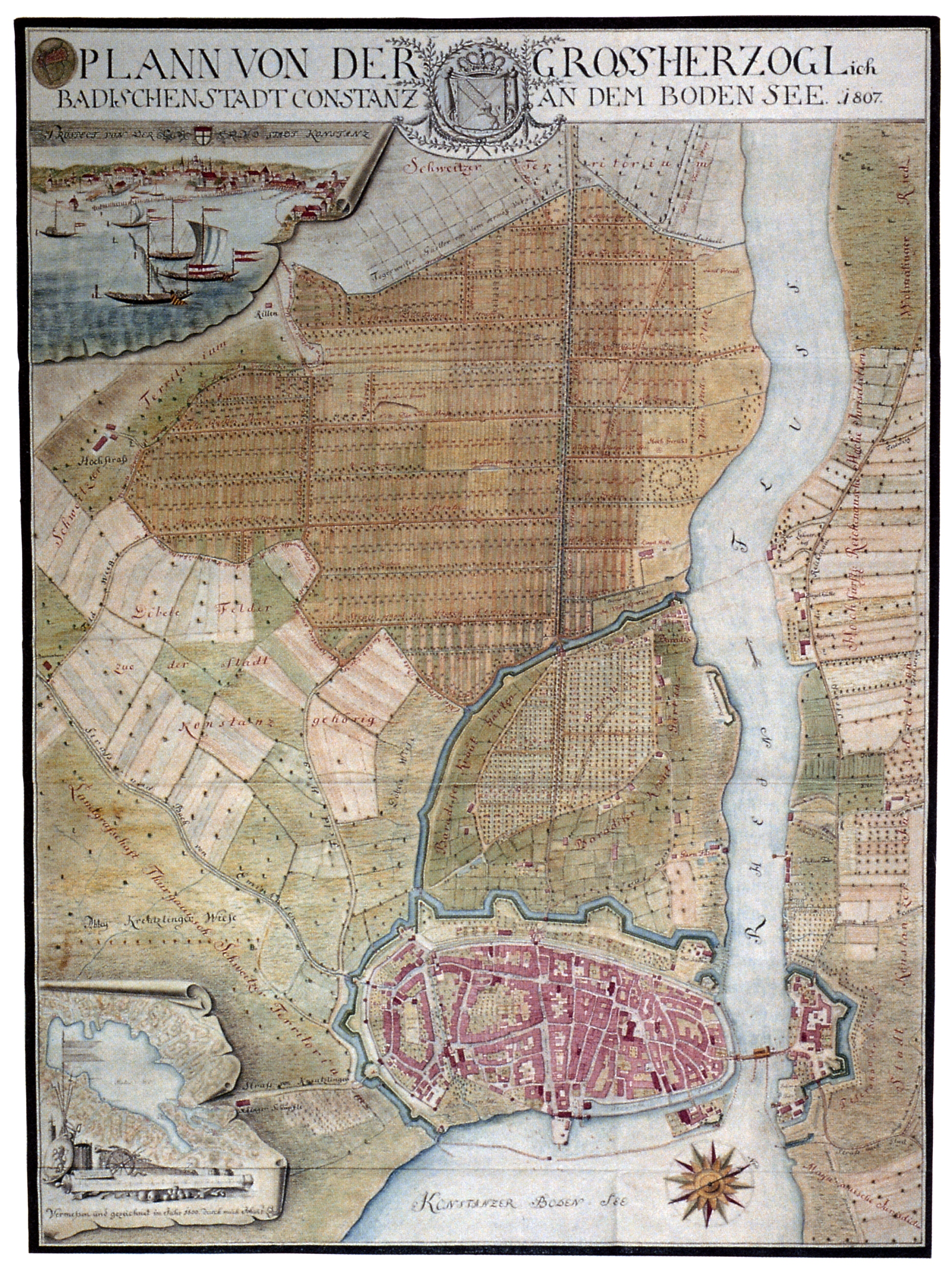
Survey map of Constance from 1807. The Tägermoos in the top third and is colored brown. The small-scale division into plots of 1800 is clearly visible, as is the location of the Tägermoos outside the ramparts (blue). The brickyard is still the only building.

With the collapse of the Old Swiss Confederation and the founding of the Helvetic Republic in 1798, a Swiss national state was established, with its borders corresponding to the former areas of high justice. The existing rights of low justice were redistributed; only the right of high justice determined the borders of the new state. The right of high justice in the Tägermoos had been held by the Confederacy since 1499; the Tägermoos and surrounding parts of Thurgau were therefore awarded to the new Helvetic Republic, while maintaining habitual ownership and rights of use held by the city remained.

During the War of the Second Coalition, Constance was occupied by French troops and largely removed from the sovereignty of Further Austria. In 1800, the magistrate of Constance ordered the commons of Tägermoos surveyed and divided into plot. Leases for the plots were awarded to those interested using a lottery. What had previously been a public pasture, available to all, was now divided into plots of 18 are and leased out. Most of the new plots were cultivated are arable land and are so used to this day. This resulted in a small-scale surface with complicated and frequently changing contractual relationships.

=== Treaty of 1831 ===
The City of Constance retained special rights in Tägermoos that went beyond what was otherwise the case for previous owners of a newly organized territory. The special status was defined in a bilateral treaty, signed in 1831, between the Grand Duchy of Baden and the Canton of Thurgau, which is still in force and can only be terminated by mutual agreement.

The background of this treaty was a series of disputes about the border. In Thurgau, it was felt that the Tägermoos belonged to the canton, and so Thurgau raised taxes from the landowners. Baden disagreed and demanded freedom from Swiss taxation in the Tägermoos; in 1821 Baden even started raising toll on the road to Tägerwilen. Similar disputes existed in other areas on the High Rhine, for example Diessenhofen and Büsingen am Hochrhein. In these cases had belonged to Swiss monasteries before 1803 and were now held by Baden.

In 1829, the parties reached a compromise. Details were laid down in a treaty signed on 28 March 1831. Constance retained its rights in the Tägermoos and in return Diessenhofen acquired similar rights on the German side at Gailingen am Hochrhein. The old moat between Paradies and the Tägermoos was declared to be the boundary between Baden and Thurgau. In 1878 and 1938, minor changes to the Swiss-German border in the Constance area were made with mutual agreement, but these were not related to the Tägermoos.

== Properties ==
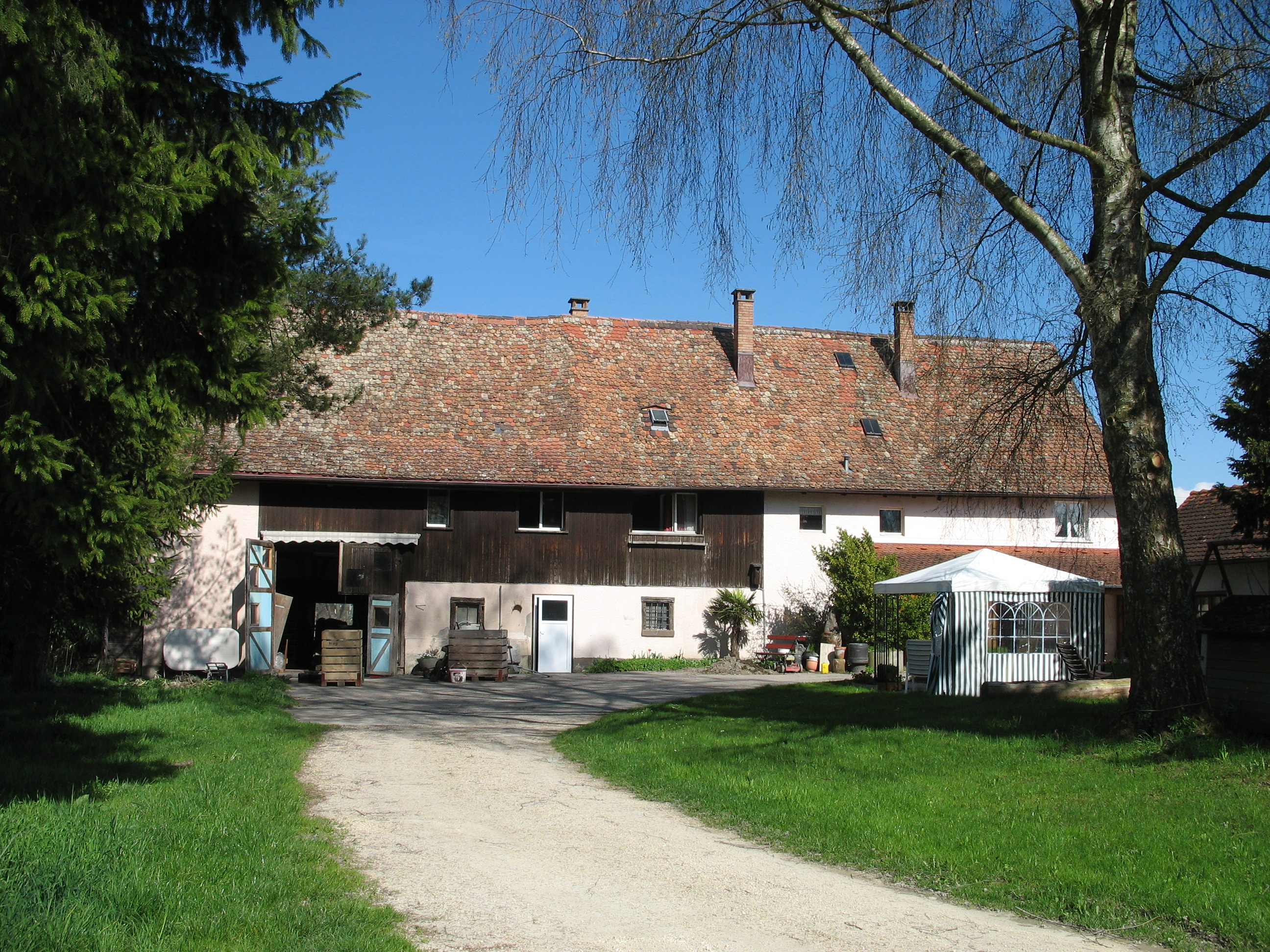
Farmstead Ziegelhof in Tägermoos

The Tägermoos is part of a small-scale farming region that extends past the villages of Tägerwilen and Gottlieben and continues to Ermatingen. This region is bounded on the south by a hill ridge. The emphasis in agricultural use is on vegetable farming, but there are also apple trees and an allotment area. The bank of the Seerhein is only partially fixed. There is an official lido, and an unofficial one at Kuhhorn, 200 metres (yards) upriver. Other parts of the embankment are fixed with reed beds and deciduous trees. The whole area is only one or two metres (3' to 6') above the water level of the Seerhein, and is occasionally flooded, most recently in June and July 1999.

There are six inhabited properties in Tägermoos with a total of about 20 inhabitants:

1. Ziegelhof
2. Zollhof
3. Trompeterschlössle
4. Weiherstrasse
5. Unter-Hochstrass
6. Ribi-Brunnegg

The Ziegelhof ("brick yard") is by far the oldest building on the Tägermoos and for four centuries was the only one. It used to be the urban brick yard of the city of Constance, which was transferred here in 1446. Bricks were still produced here in the early 19th century. The Ziegelhof stood just west of the city gallows, which served as a scaffold well into the 19th century. Near the entrance to the Ziegelhof is a small bakery with an 18th-century open fireplace. Bread for the inhabitants of the Tägermoos used to be baked here. Dairy farming in the Tägermoos ceased in 1971 and the area has since concentrated on vegetable gardening.

The second oldest occupied property in the Tägermoos is the Zollhof, which was constructed as a Swiss customs house in the second half of the 19th century.

The Trompeterschlössle was built in 1903 and 1904 by the German Anton Reiser only a few metres (yards) from the border, without a construction permit, from neither Tägerwilen nor Constance. It was originally a spices store. A hall was added where dances took place. It is now used as a hotel.

The Weiherstrasse ("Pond Road") was constructed in the late 1940 in the so-called Nopelsgut the southeast of the Tägermoos. It runs on the west along the brick pond and continues south, crossing the border into Kreuzlingen. Later the roads Hochstrass and Ribi-Brunnegg were constructed in the south; these also connect to roads in Kreuzlingen. There are also isolated greenhouses and other farm utility buildings.

In the southeast the Tägermoos extends to the 2.4-acre Ziegelweiher ("Brick Pond") in a field named Sauösch. About half a hectare of the pond is on Tägermoos's territory.

Since 2000, the German and Swiss customs operate a joint customs facility at the point where the Swiss A7 motorway connects to the German B33. This facility was created to relieve the border crossing facility in the city. For the construction of this new facility, the City of Constance sold a portion of their land holdings in the Tägermoos to the Swiss Federal Customs Administration.

A much smaller customs facility named Gottlieber Zoll exists at the site of the former city gate of Paradies. Nearby is a transformer substation of the City of Constance Utilities Division.

As part of its land use policy, the City of Constance plans to buy more land in the Tägermoos from private owners.

== Legal status ==
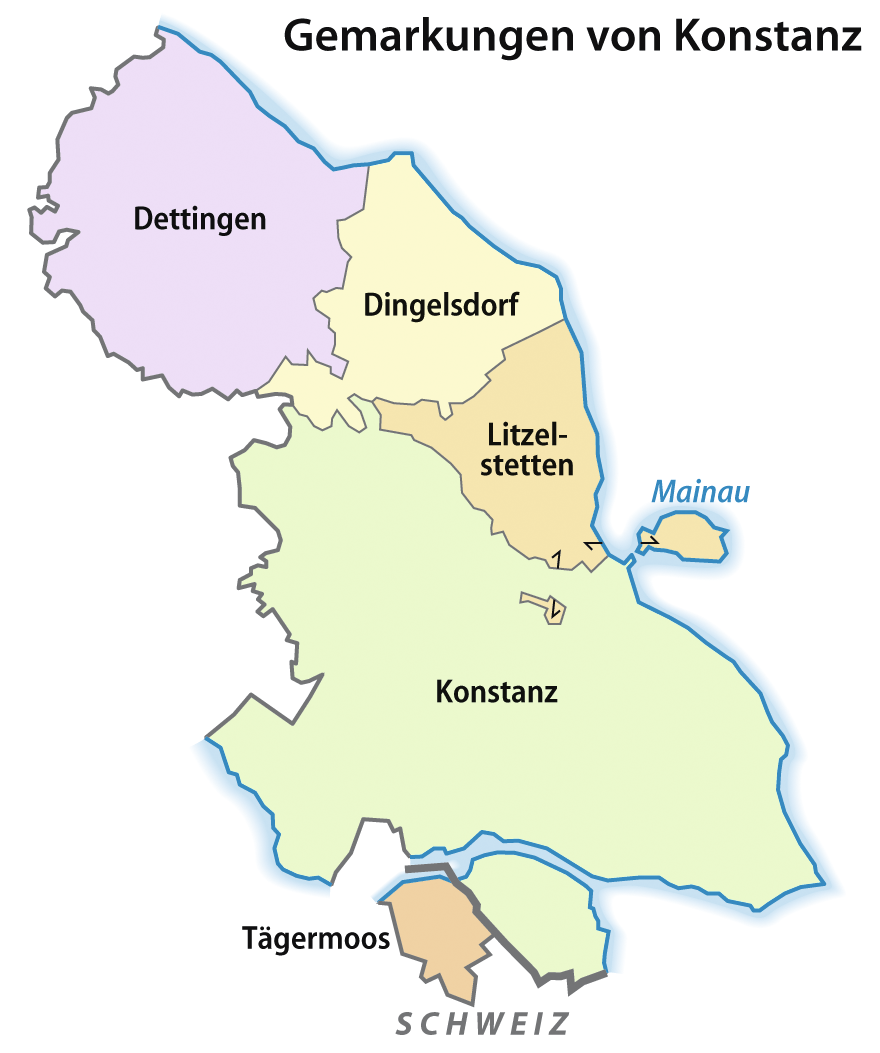
Gemarkungen of Constance

The odd status of the area can be explained from the State Treaty of 28 March 1831. At the state level, the Tägermoos belongs to Switzerland, to the canton of Thurgau, and to the municipality of Tägerwilen. The Swiss Federal Statistical Office has not assigned a separate code number to the area, but includes it under Community Identification Number 4649 (Tägerwilen). The State Statistical Office of Baden-Württemberg agrees that Tägermoos is in Switzerland, and hence does not report on it.

At the municipal level, the tasks are divided between the City of Constance and the municipality of Tägerwilen.

The City of Constance is responsible in the following areas:

- Surveying and land registry are provided by the City Planning and Survey Office. The Tägermoos forms a separate Gemarkung within the city (§ 3 of the Tägermoos Statute). The coordinate system used in the Tägermoos is the Gauss–Krüger coordinate system used in Germany and not the Swiss coordinate system. Heights above mean sea level in the Tägermoos are measured with respect to the Amsterdam datum, like in Germany, not the Marseille datum used in the rest of Switzerland. The difference between the two datums is about 25 cm (9.8 in).

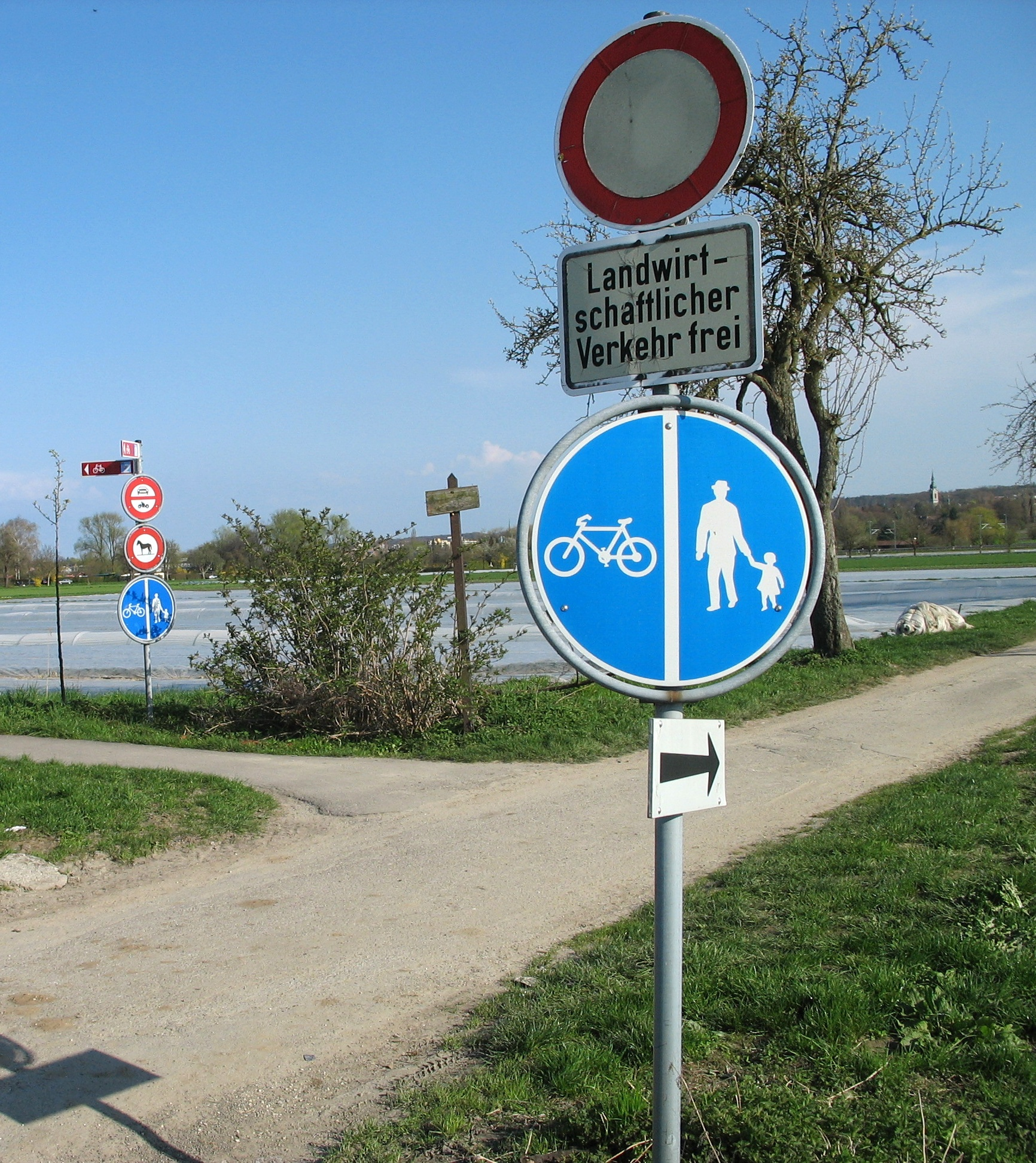
German traffic sign on top and a Swiss sign below; in the background other Swiss signs

- Road construction and maintenance. Traffic signs are mixed: both German and Swiss traffic signs are found in the Tägermoos
- Enforcement of certain rules and regulations (§ 4).
- The City of Constance supplies gas and drinking water to the area.

The responsibilities of Tägerwilen include:

- Decisions on construction permits.
- Various administrative tasks. Some lawyers believe, however, that due to the growth of municipal functions since the conclusion of the treaty a legal gap has arisen.

Also for taxation of the land, there are some derogations in the state treaty: property owners who live in Constance, do not pay property tax or income tax to the municipality of Tägerwilen but only the property tax to the canton of Thurgau. Property owners living in Thurgau do pay income tax, but are exempt from the Swiss property tax.

Legal historian Hans-Wolfgang Strätz holds the view that the treaty makes the City of Constance de jure a municipality in Thurgau, with all the rights and obligations this entails, even if the City does not itself carry out some of the responsibilities.

In February 2006, the municipalities of Constance, Kreuzlingen and Tägerwilen announced that they will seek to have the 175-year-old treaty revised. Since the legal successors of the treaty signatories, the State of Baden-Württemberg and the Canton of Thurgau are no longer authorized to conclude treaties of this kind, negotiations about a change of legal status will have to take place on the level of the federal governments. Any change of the treaty would also require a referendum in the affected Swiss communities.

== The Tägermoos as a border crossing ==
Since 1803 there has been a border crossing between Germany and Switzerland in the Tägermoos, known as Gottlieber Zoll or Tägerwilen Zoll. Farmers from Constance can cross here duty-free. The "open border" at the Tägermoos has often been used for smuggling. In days gone by, farmers drove their cattle illegally across the border here, in order to sell it in Switzerland, without paying duties, or to circumvent export restrictions. Smuggling of goods in the opposite direction was also observed frequently. During the economic crisis of the 1920s in particular, the farmers of Paradies smuggled luxury goods and building materials and lived a wealthier lifestyle than their farming income could have afforded.

Nevertheless, the border was sometimes completely closed, most recently during World War II from 1940 to 1946. With the border closure both states - Switzerland and Nazi Germany - would ensure that refugees could not reach Switzerland. Germany also feared a military informations might leak across the border. During World War II, Switzerland stationed troops in German-Swiss border towns including Tägermoos, in order, to protect the border from the threat of attacks on the neutral territory of Switzerland.

To close the border, Germany and Switzerland constructed a 2.60 metres (8 ft 6 in) high and 2,700 metres (3,000 yards) long border fence from mesh and barbed wire, popularly known as the "Jews fence". The first part of the fence between the railway station and Kreuzlinger customs post was constructed in 1939 and funded by Swiss authorities. The German authorities in Stuttgart completed the closure of the Tägermoos in November 1940. The best known border incident is perhaps the arrest of the resistance fighter Georg Elser at the Kreuzlingen customs post.

In October 2006 the city council of Constance decided to trim the remaining border fence in Tägermoos from 2.60 metres (8 ft 6 in) down to the "fence height" of 1.40 metres (4 ft 7 in). The fence is now located primarily on private land. A 20-metre (yard) long section of fence is scheduled to become a memorial.

== Geology ==
The name "Tägermoos" is derived from the Old High German Tëgar = "big" and Moos = "marsh". So it means "big marsh", a common name in southern Germany for wetlands or marshes. In fact, geologically speaking, it is not a peat bog, but a "anmoor", a mineral soil with a very high proportion of undecomposed organic matter.

The nearby Thurgau Hills are glacial moraines, which consist of till. Upstream of the moraine is a 500-meter (550-yard) wide border of clay, which was washed out of the glacial material. About this clay, we find a several meter high layer of sediments from periods when the water level of Lake Constance was higher. Water can be trapped in these sediments by intercalated clay layers, thereby forming stagnosol, a soil type that is usually moist due to being waterlogged, but can also dry out completely. Close to the Seerhein, a more recent layer of river sediments lies on top of all this.

The area of the Tägermoos has only a very slight slope and is approximately one to two metres (3 to 6 feet) above the water level of the Seerhein. The moist soil required comprehensive drainage to allow intensive agricultural use. It is, however, very fertile, due to its high humus content.
