= Paradies, Konstanz =

Quarter of Konstanz, Baden-Württemberg, Germany

Coordinates: 47.6656°N 9.1608°E

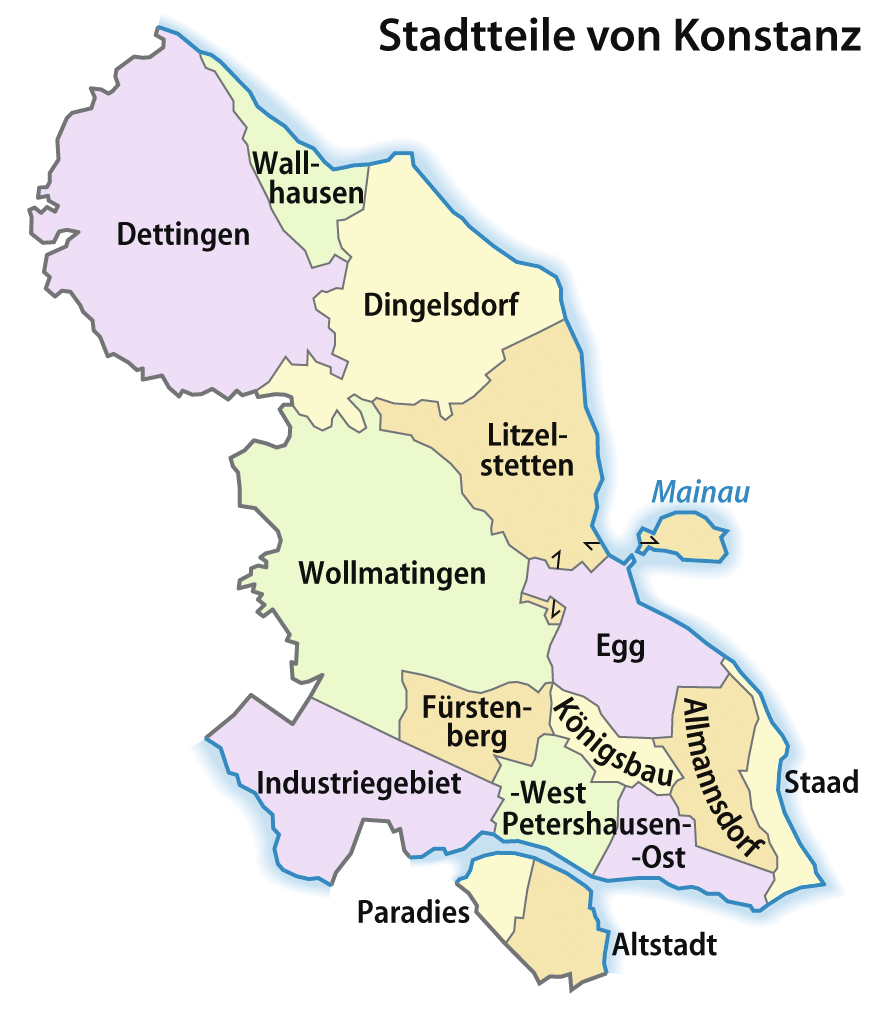
Konstanz' districts: Paradies in the west of the Old Town

Paradies (literally: "paradise") is a former village, now a quarter of Konstanz, Germany. The district is located west of the Old Town on the southern shore of the Seerhein; with an area of about 63.2 hectare (632,034 m^{2} (6,803,160 sq ft), to be exact) and 6176 inhabitants (2007 census).

In the Late Middle Ages, it was a fishing and farming village called Eggehusen. Its original centre was the St Leonard's Chapel erected in the 14th century at the site of a former Poor Clares monastery with the name claustrum Paradysi apud Constantiam founded in 1186. In 1253 the nuns left their convent on the outskirts of Konstanz and moved to Schlatt near Schaffhausen; while the name Paradies stuck. The chapel was rebuilt in 1921, it today is consecrated to St Martin.

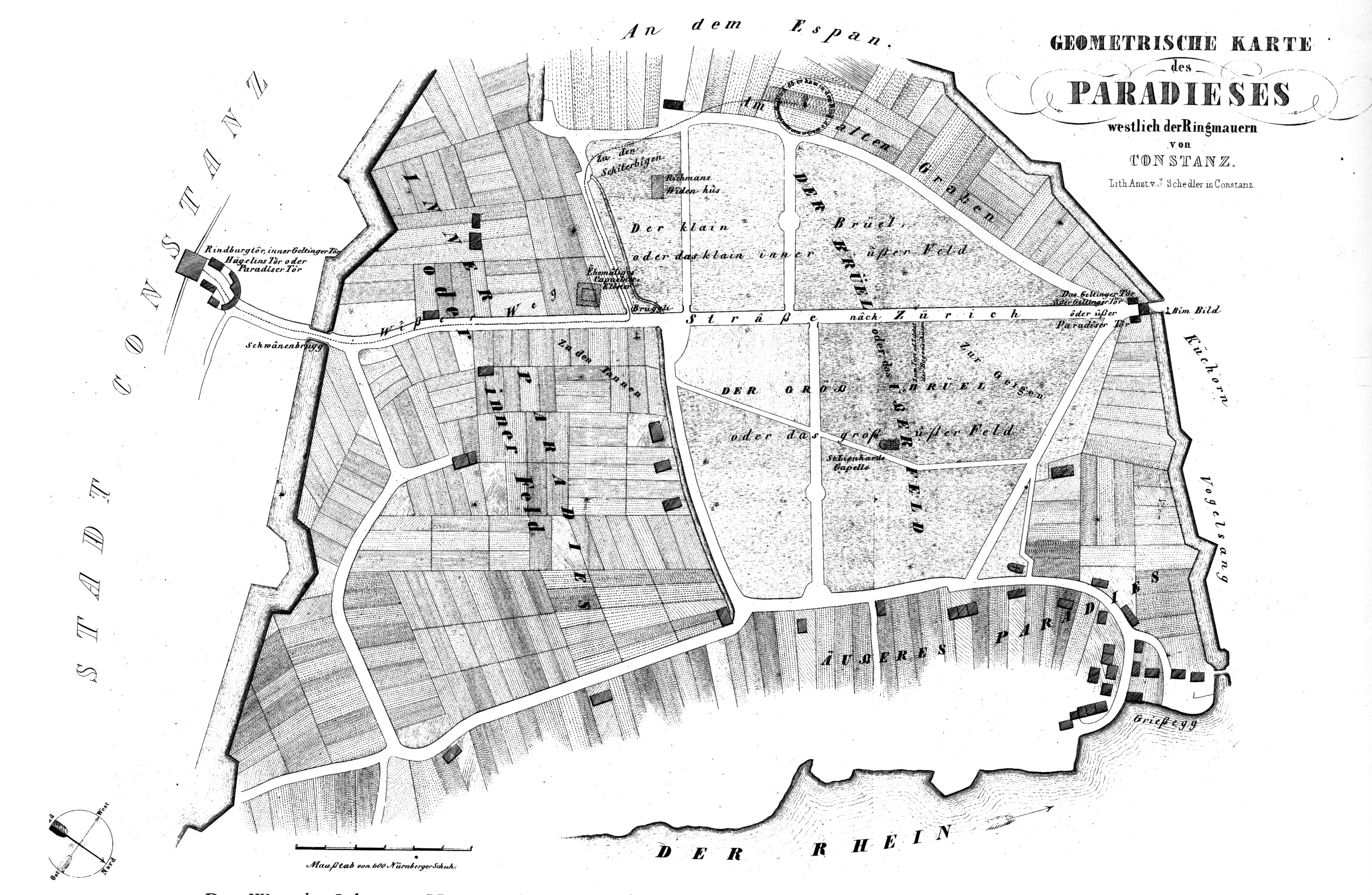
1847 map with the presumed place of the execution of Jan Hus (encircled)

In 1610, about 300 people were living in Paradies. The farmers in Paradies supplied the inhabitants of the city from their fields on the open space between the current federal road B 33 (Europe Street) and the city walls. Paradies then was a separate municipality. In 1639, the City of Konstanz created a new defensive earth wall and ditch (the Saubach); Paradies was included inside this perimeter. The Paradies part of the structure included two towers, the Grießeggturm at the Gottlieber customs post, and one small castle named Paradieser Schlössle. With the loss of arable land between Paradies and Konstanz, cultivation of vegetables shifted to the Tägermoos area west of Paradies, which was owned by the city of Konstanz, but was administratively in the Swiss canton of Thurgau.

When the city of Constance stopped operating a municipal bull stable, Paradies started its own. By 1880 the population had risen to nearly 1500. Today the number of farmers growing vegetables is steadily declining. In 1969, there were 25 of them in Paradies; in 2006 there were only eight. The last cattle farmer ceased operations in 1994.

Until the summer of 2004, the municipal bus route No. 10 went from the city's cemetery to Paradies. Buses named Friedhof—Paradies ("Cemetery—Paradise") were often photographed.
