= Bull stable =

In some areas of Germany and Alsace, municipalities were tasked with maintaining one or more bulls, who would fertilize all cows in the area upon request. The building where the bull(s) were kept was called a bull stable or bull barn (German: Farrenstall). This practice was most common in the 19th century in the area that is now Baden-Württemberg, though new bull barns were being built into the 20th century.

In many German-speaking territories, for example the Kingdom of Württemberg, the duty of municipalities to provide this service was imposed by law in the first half of the 19th century. In some municipalities, an individual farmer was paid to keep the father bull, but most municipalities constructed a municipal building to keep the sire.

The invention of artificial insemination in 1960 made it unnecessary to keep municipal bulls and by the 1980s, most Farrenstalle were no longer in use and were abandoned. The requirement was officially lifted with a change of the law which went into effect on January 1st, 2000.

The empty buildings that were usually part of the tradition and community, and were often listed buildings. Most of them were converted to other community purposes, such as youth centers, restaurants or club houses. Many of these retain the name Farrenstall. This word was derived from the Swabian word for bull. Outside of Baden-Württemberg, the word was usually spelled Faselstall.

== See also ==
- Livestock
