= Petershausen, Konstanz =

Petershausen
- Ortsteil of Constance
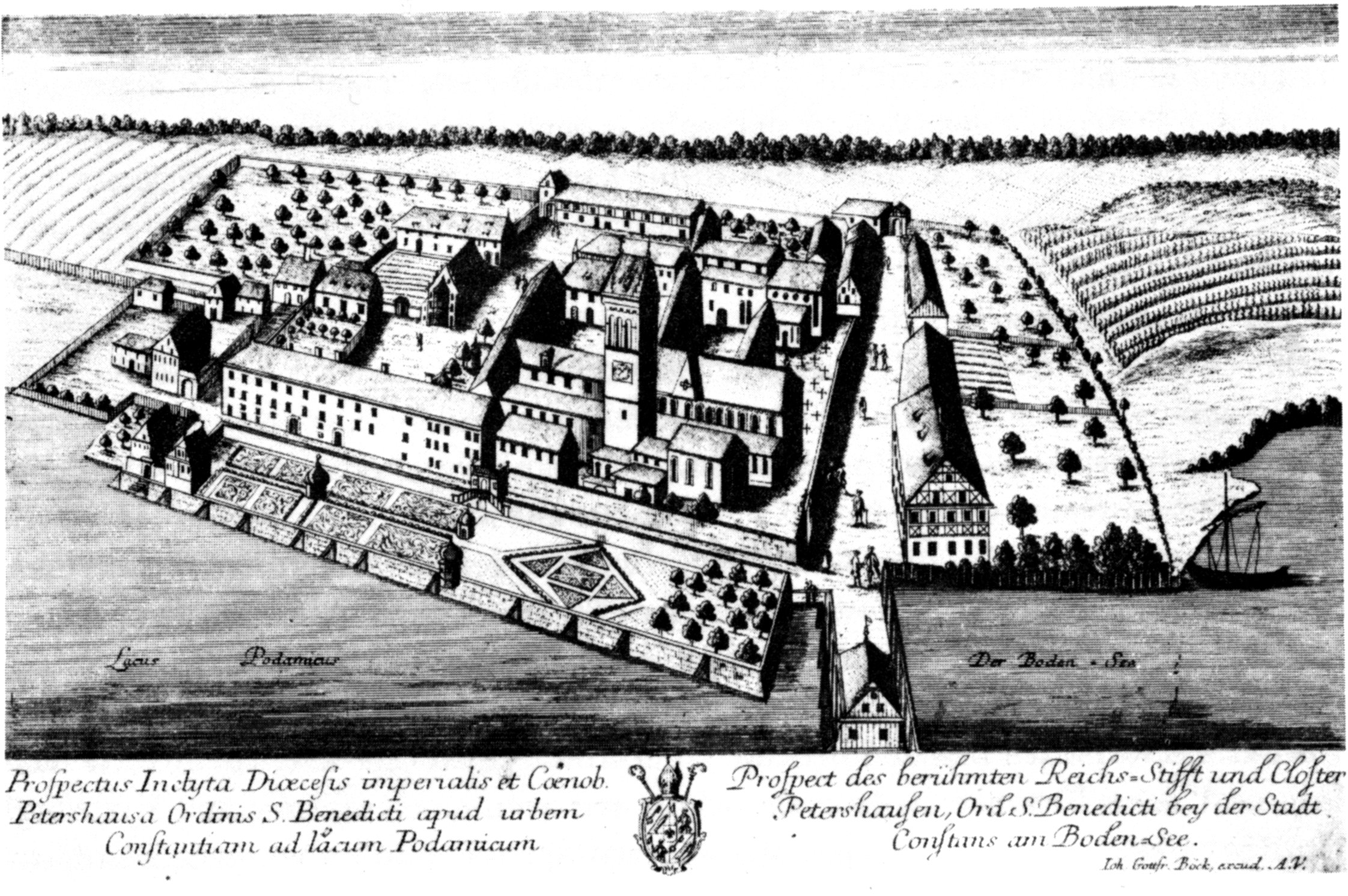
- Petershausen Abbey, with residential buildings of the upper village to the upper right of the bridge and the lower village of the left of the monastery gardens

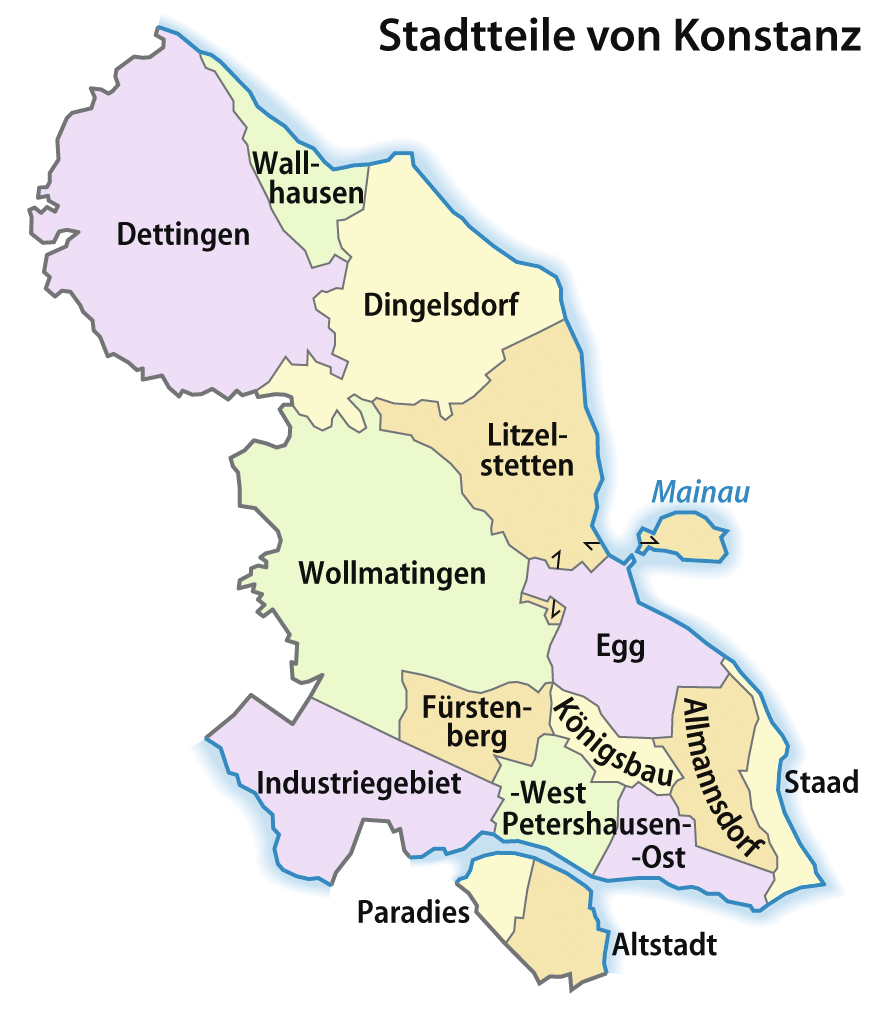
- Location of Petershausen within Constance
- Interactive map of Petershausen
- Location within Germany Location within Baden-Württemberg
- Coordinates: 47°40′6″N 9°10′51″E
- Country: Germany
- State: Baden-Württemberg
- Admin. region: Freiburg
- District: Konstanz
- City: Constance

Area
  - Total: 3.45 km^{2} (1.33 sq mi)
- Elevation: 401 m (1,316 ft)

Population
  - Total: 19,492
  - Density: 5,650/km^{2} (14,600/sq mi)
- Time zone: UTC+01:00 (CET)
  - Summer (DST): UTC+02:00 (CEST)

Petershausen (German pronunciation: [peːtɐsˈhaʊzn̩]) is a district of Constance. It is situated on the right bank of the Seerhein, opposite the city centre. It was named after the Petershausen Abbey.

== History ==
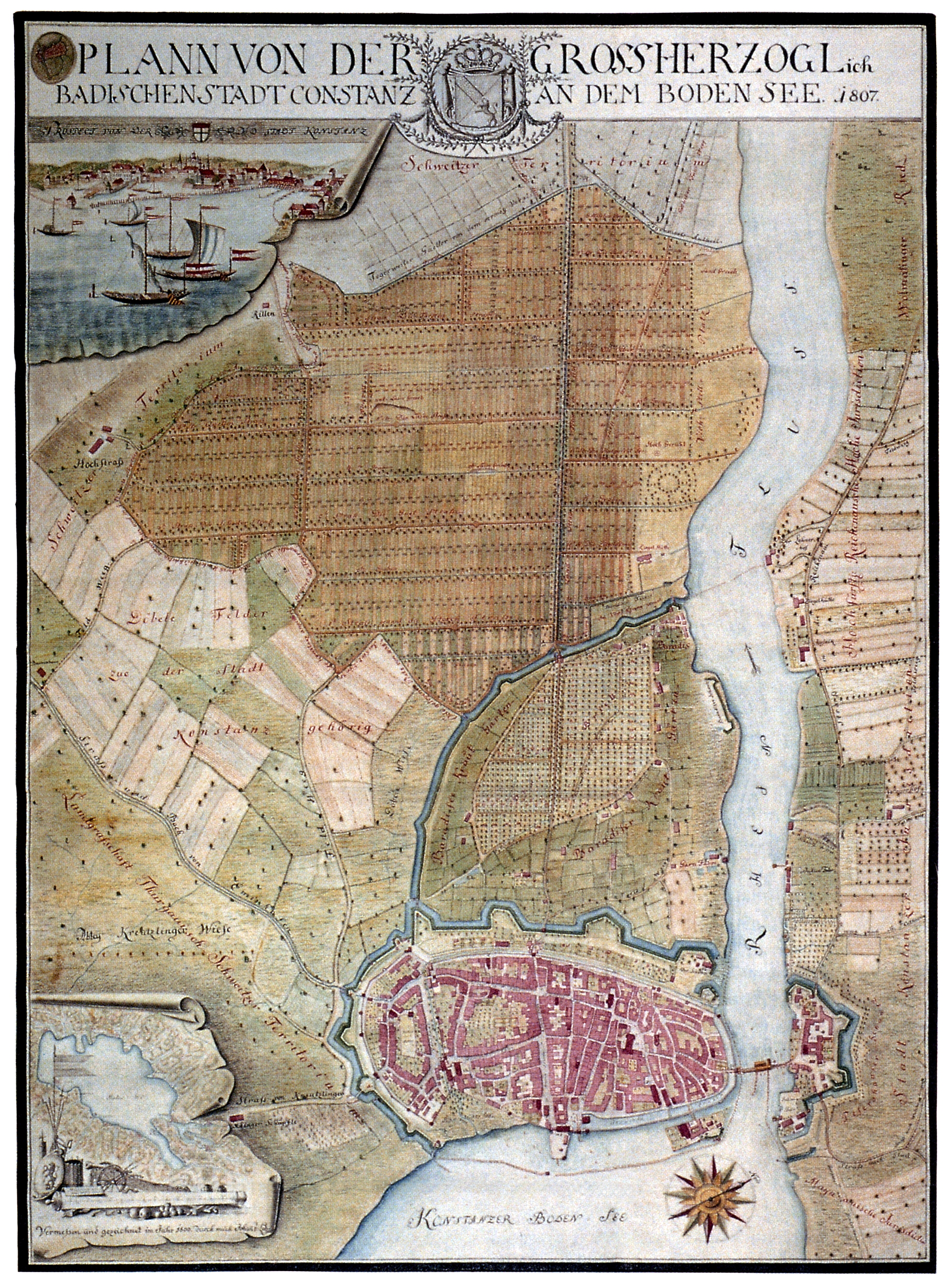
Map of Constance and Peterhausen, 1807

There was a Roman settlement at this point, which was abandoned in the third century. Later. the area came into the possession of the Reichenau Abbey. A new settlement emerged after bishop Gebhard of Constance founded the imperial abbey of Petershausen. The settlement consisted of a double village: the upper village to the east of the monastery, known as the Sternenviertel ("Star Quarter"), after the local inn Zum Sternen ("to the stars"), and a lower village, in which the servants of the monastery lived, southwest of the monastery, along the road to Reichenau. The villages developed relatively independently, but came increasingly under the influence of the city of Constance and became a suburb of Constance around the year 1600.

The development of Petershausen still remained quiet at first. The suburb lost an important engine for development when the monastery was secularized in 1802 and the monastic building subsequently began to decay. The remaining usable building of the monastery were used as a military hospital and expanded in 1850 to barracks. In 1863 Baden State Railway connected Constance to its network with a terminal station at Petershausen. This led to an upswing of Constance and Petershausen in particular. Growth of Constance to the south was limited by the Swiss border, so the increase in population primarily occurred around the former monastery at Petershausen. Promenades and new residential areas were built east of the Star Quarter, along the shore of Lake Constance, and in the north, along the road to Wollmatingen. In 1912, an elementary school was founded in Petershausen, today's Theodor-Heuss-Realschule. A new church was planned in 1913, but was delayed by World War I and the subsequent inflation and was only dedicated 17 years later.

The Star Quarter was torn down in 1936 to make room for the expansion of the Old Rhine Bridge. The entire neighbourhood was demolished to make room for a multi-lane road and a railway underpass in the direction of Staad. Only the name of the traffic junction Sternenplatz ("star place") is a reminder of the former quarter.
