= Gottlieben =

- Municipality
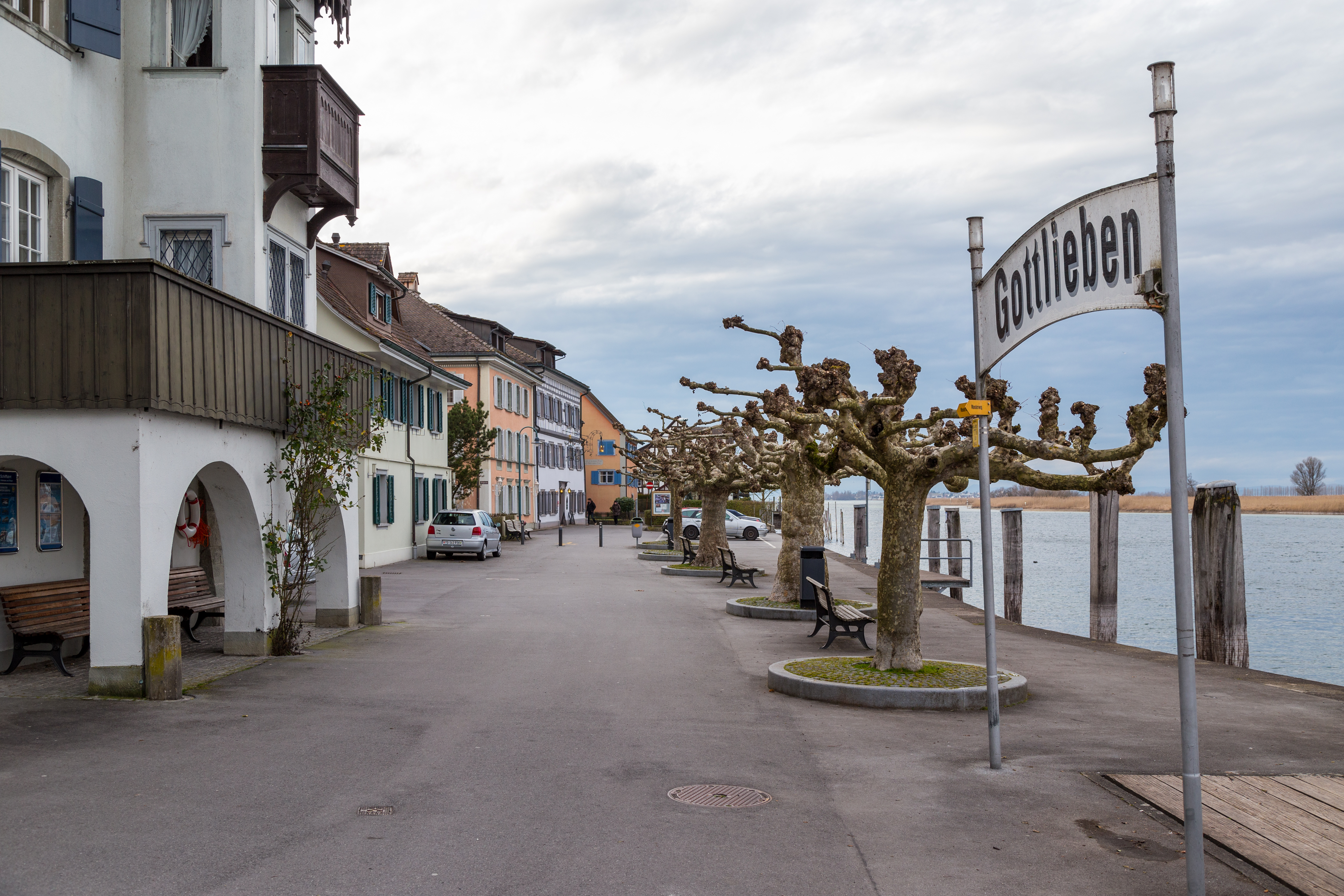

- Coat of arms
- Location of Gottlieben
- Location within Switzerland Location within Canton of Thurgau
- Coordinates: 47°40′N 9°8′E
- Country: Switzerland
- Canton: Thurgau
- District: Kreuzlingen

Area
  - Total: 0.33 km^{2} (0.13 sq mi)
- Elevation: 400 m (1,300 ft)

Population (December 2007)
  - Total: 320
  - Density: 970/km^{2} (2,500/sq mi)
- Time zone: UTC+01:00 (CET)
  - Summer (DST): UTC+02:00 (CEST)
- Postal code: 8274
- SFOS number: 4651
- ISO 3166 code: CH-TG
- Surrounded by: Constance (Konstanz) (DE-BW), Ermatingen, Reichenau (DE-BW), Tägerwilen
- Website: www.gottlieben.ch

Gottlieben is a municipality in the district of Kreuzlingen in the canton of Thurgau in Switzerland.

== History ==
Gottlieben is first mentioned around the end of the 10th century as Gotiliubon. It was originally part of the land owned by the Bishop of Constance. In 1251, Eberhard von Waldburg built a castle that served as the residence of the Bishops. After the Swabian War in 1499 the episcopal chief constable managed the village and the local low court from the castle until 1798. The court included Engwilen, Siegershausen and Tägerwilen as well as Gottlieben and made up the Bishop's bailiwick of Gottlieben. In 1808 the castle became private property. In 1837 it was renovated in a neo-gothic style.

Originally Gottlieben was in the parish of Tägerwilen. During the Protestant Reformation (1529) the population converted to the new faith. In 1734–35, the church was built and the Swiss Reformed Church parish of Gottlieben was formed. Since 1912, this parish has been combined with Tägerwilen.

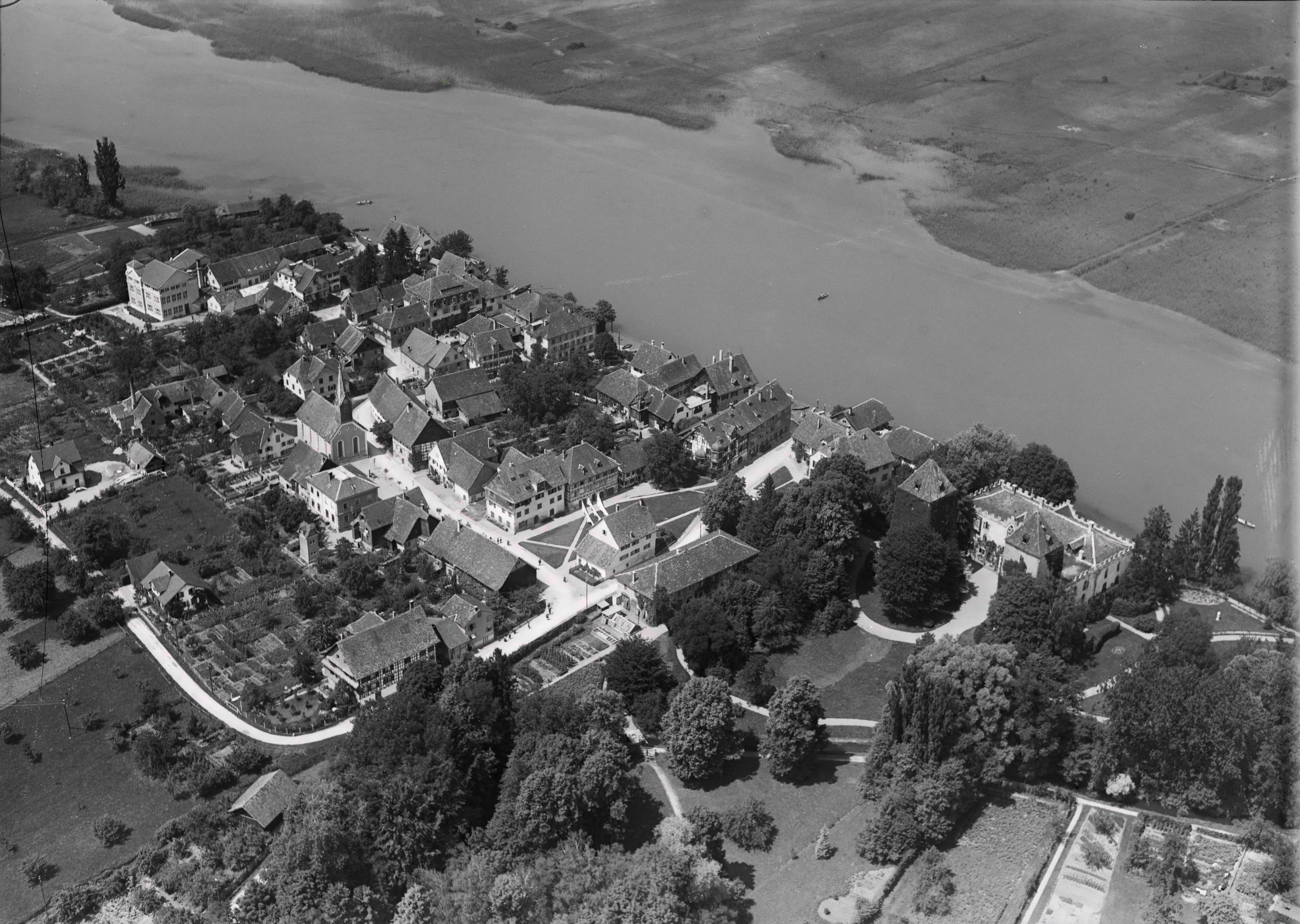
Aerial view from 100 m by Walter Mittelholzer (1919)

In the 17th and 18th centuries the village witnessed an economic boom because of its convenient location for Rhine traffic. It became a commercial and trading center for salt, iron and wine. In 1678 it received market rights. Although in the 19th century small industries settled in Gottlieben (the button factory, horsehair spinning), until after the mid-20th century fishing, crafts and trade formed the main occupation of the population. After 1945, tourism developed into the main industry of the village, so that today only two boat yards and the famous restaurant Hüppenbäckerei remain. In 2000 the Bodman-Haus, the former home of the poet Emanuel von Bodman (1874–1946), opened a memorial and cultural center.

== Geography ==
Gottlieben has an area, as of 2009, of 0.33 square kilometers (0.13 sq mi). Of this area, 0.05 km^{2} (0.019 sq mi) or 15.2% is used for agricultural purposes, while 0.05 km^{2} (0.019 sq mi) or 15.2% is forested. Of the rest of the land, 0.14 km^{2} (35 acres) or 42.4% is settled (buildings or roads) and 0.12 km^{2} (30 acres) or 36.4% is unproductive land.

Of the built up area, industrial buildings made up 21.2% of the total area while housing and buildings made up 6.1% and transportation infrastructure made up 3.0%. while parks, green belts and sports fields made up 12.1%. Out of the forested land, 3.0% of the total land area is heavily forested and 12.1% is covered with orchards or small clusters of trees. Of the agricultural land, 15.2% is used for growing crops. All of the unproductive land is unproductive vegetation.

The municipality is located in the Kreuzlingen district, north-west of Kreuzlingen at the mouth of the Rhine into the Untersee section of Lake Constance.

== Demographics ==
Gottlieben has a population (as of December 2020) of 337. As of 2008, 31.5% of the population are foreign nationals. Over the last 10 years (1997–2007) the population has changed at a rate of 6.8%. Most of the population (as of 2000) speaks German (93.1%), with Italian being second most common ( 1.3%) and Portuguese being third ( 1.3%).

As of 2008, the gender distribution of the population was 49.8% male and 50.2% female. The population was made up of 99 Swiss men (31.8% of the population), and 56 (18.0%) non-Swiss men. There were 114 Swiss women (36.7%), and 42 (13.5%) non-Swiss women.

In 2008 there were 2 live births to Swiss citizens and births to non-Swiss citizens, and in same time span there were 3 deaths of Swiss citizens. Ignoring immigration and emigration, the population of Swiss citizens decreased by 1 while the foreign population remained the same. There was 1 Swiss man, 3 non-Swiss men who emigrated from Switzerland to another country and 5 non-Swiss women who emigrated from Switzerland to another country. The total Swiss population change in 2008 (from all sources) was a decrease of 1 and the non-Swiss population change was a decrease of 1 people. This represents a population growth rate of -0.6%.

The age distribution, as of 2009, in Gottlieben is; 24 children or 7.8% of the population are between 0 and 9 years old and 27 teenagers or 8.7% are between 10 and 19. Of the adult population, 21 people or 6.8% of the population are between 20 and 29 years old. 35 people or 11.3% are between 30 and 39, 73 people or 23.6% are between 40 and 49, and 55 people or 17.8% are between 50 and 59. The senior population distribution is 40 people or 12.9% of the population are between 60 and 69 years old, 25 people or 8.1% are between 70 and 79, there are 6 people or 1.9% who are between 80 and 89, and there are 3 people or 1.0% who are 90 and older.

As of 2000, there were 133 private households in the municipality, and an average of 2.1 persons per household. In 2000 there were 24 single family homes (or 51.1% of the total) out of a total of 47 inhabited buildings. There were 10 two family buildings (21.3%), 5 three family buildings (10.6%) and 8 multi-family buildings (or 17.0%). There were 82 (or 27.0%) persons who were part of a couple without children, and 129 (or 42.4%) who were part of a couple with children. There were 11 (or 3.6%) people who lived in single parent home, while there are 4 persons who were adult children living with one or both parents, 2 persons who lived in a household made up of relatives, 10 who lived in a household made up of unrelated persons, and 20 who are either institutionalized or live in another type of collective housing.

The vacancy rate for the municipality, in 2008, was 0%. As of 2007, the construction rate of new housing units was 0 new units per 1000 residents. In 2000 there were 150 apartments in the municipality. The most common apartment size was the 3 room apartment of which there were 40. There were 1 single room apartments and 18 apartments with six or more rooms. As of 2000 the average price to rent an average apartment in Gottlieben was 1015.06 Swiss francs (CHF) per month (US$810, £460, €650 approx. exchange rate from 2000). The average rate for a one-room apartment was 1150.00 CHF (US$920, £520, €740), a two-room apartment was about 808.47 CHF (US$650, £360, €520), a three-room apartment was about 922.29 CHF (US$740, £420, €590) and a six or more room apartment cost an average of 1496.67 CHF (US$1200, £670, €960). The average apartment price in Gottlieben was 91.0% of the national average of 1116 CHF.

In the 2007 federal election the most popular party was the SVP which received 35.26% of the vote. The next three most popular parties were the FDP (21.47%), the Green Party (15.71%) and the CVP (11.54%). In the federal election, a total of 104 votes were cast, and the voter turnout was 55.6%.

The historical population is given in the following table:

year	population
1850	268
1900	265
1941	192
1950	237
1990	295
2000	304

== Heritage sites of national significance ==
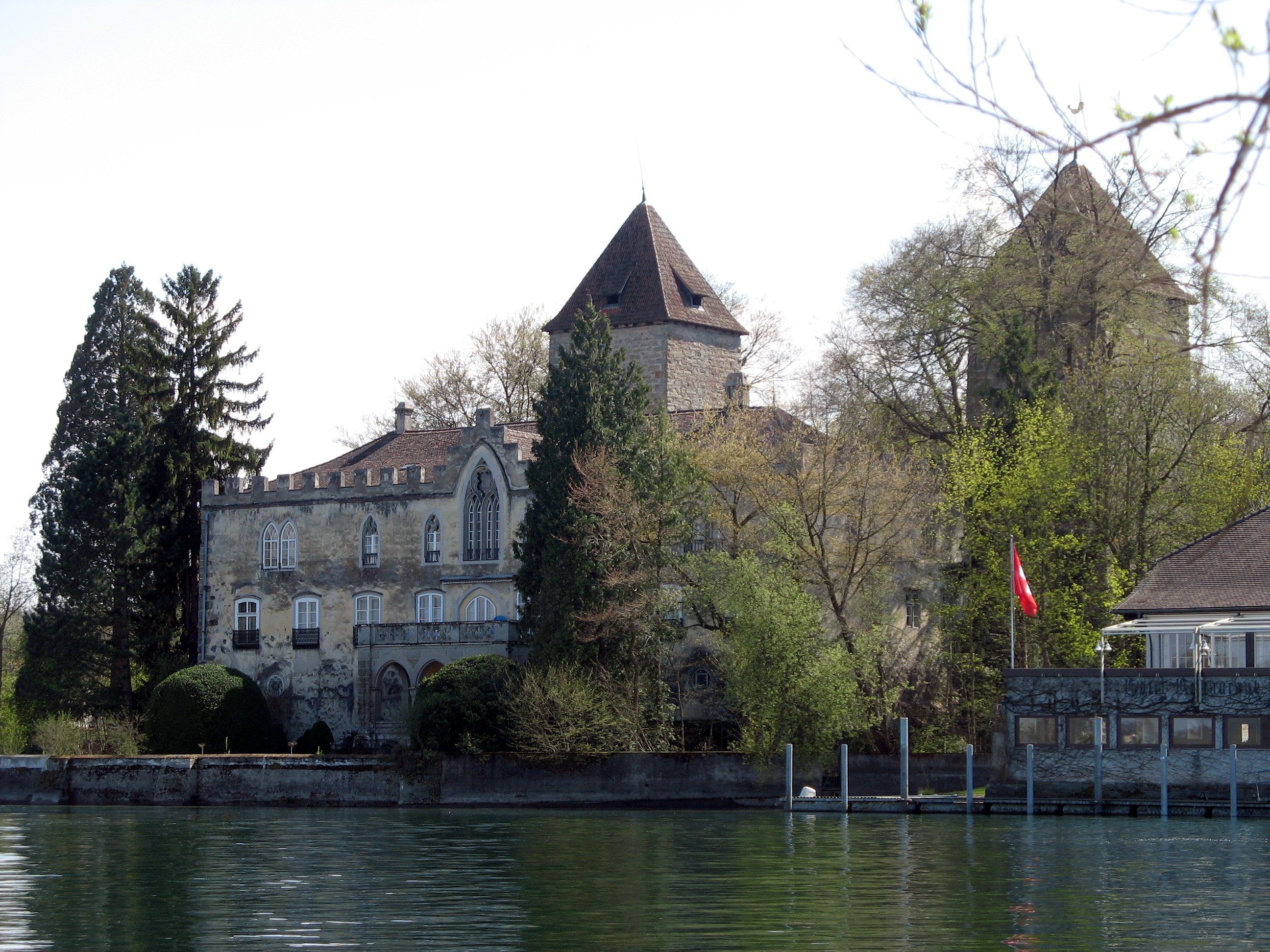
Gottlieben Castle

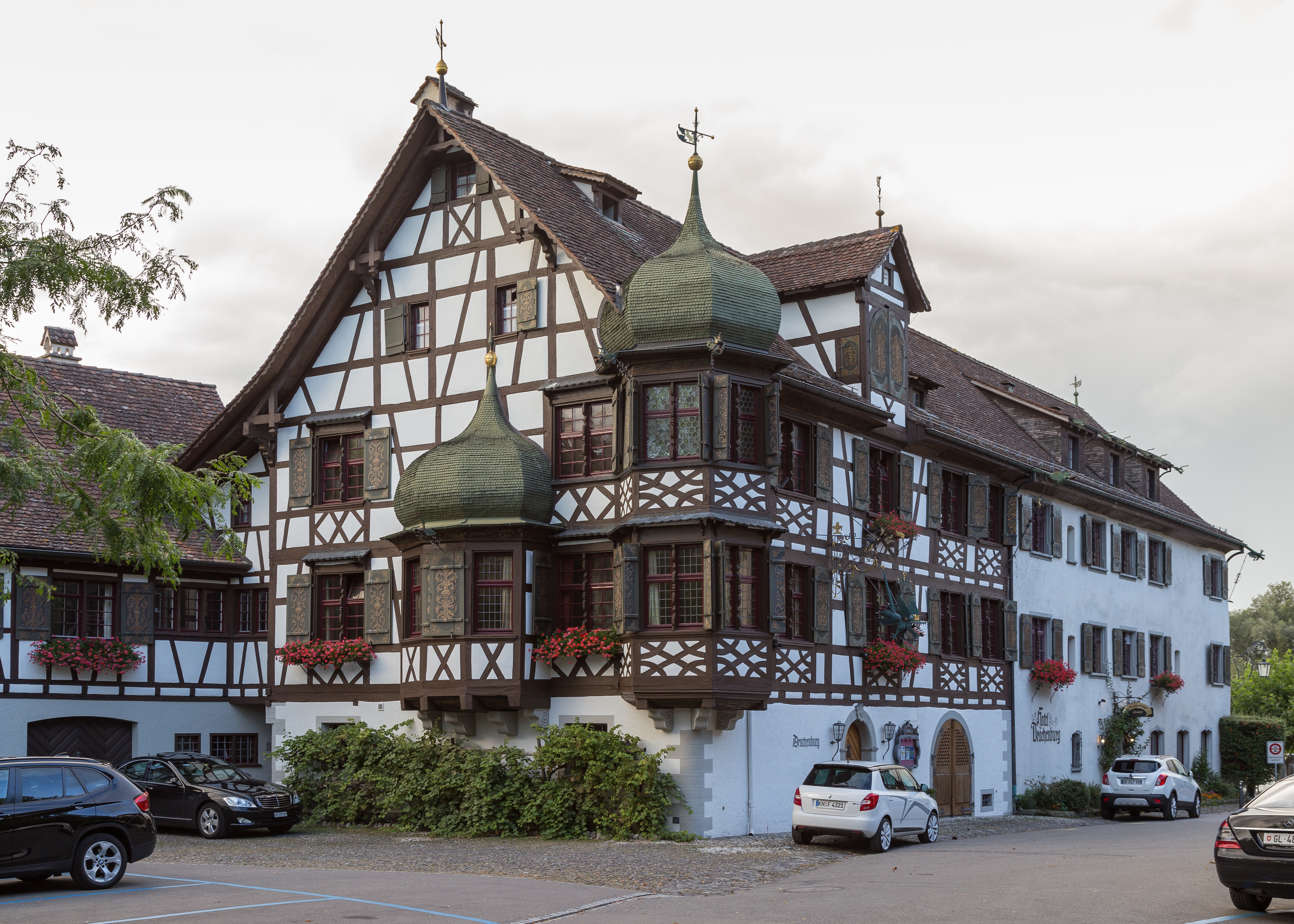
Drachenburg

The Gottlieben Castle is listed as a Swiss heritage site of national significance. The entire village of Gottlieben and the Untersee region (Ermatingen, Gottlieben, Kreuzlingen, Salenstein, Tägerwilen) are part of the Inventory of Swiss Heritage Sites.

== Economy ==
As of 2007, Gottlieben had an unemployment rate of 0.7%. As of 2005, there were people employed in the primary economic sector and about businesses involved in this sector. 59 people are employed in the secondary sector and there are 7 businesses in this sector. 124 people are employed in the tertiary sector, with 13 businesses in this sector. In 2000 there were 232 workers who lived in the municipality. Of these, 118 or about 50.9% of the residents worked outside Gottlieben while 127 people commuted into the municipality for work. There were a total of 241 jobs (of at least 6 hours per week) in the municipality. Of the working population, 4.8% used public transportation to get to work, and 53.7% used a private car.

== Transport ==
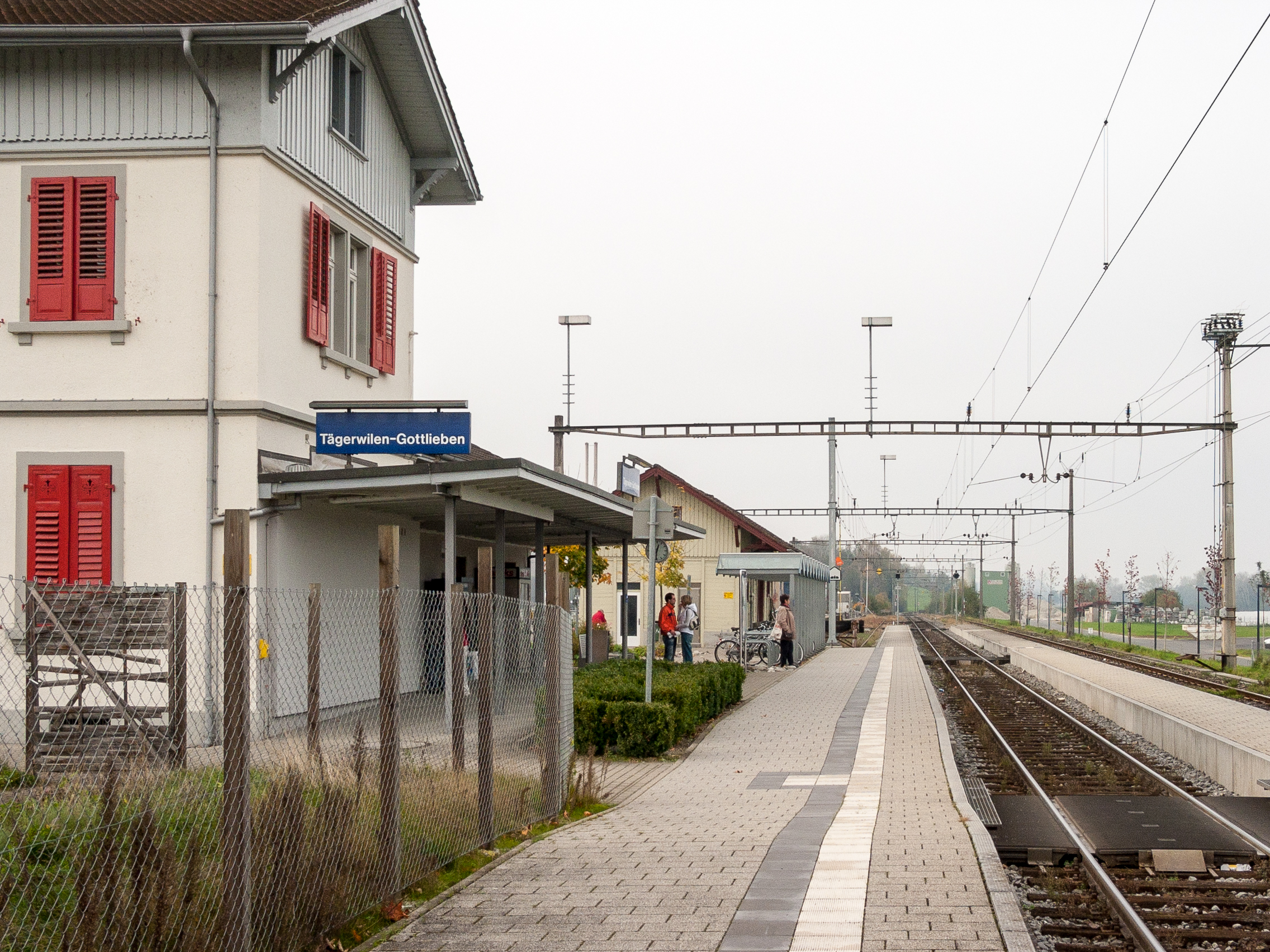
Tägerwilen-Gottlieben railway station

Tägerwilen-Gottlieben is a railway station on the Lake Line, served by the S1 regional train of St. Gallen S-Bahn.

Gottlieben has a landing stage. Between spring and autumn, the URh offers regular boat services on the High Rhine and Untersee between Schaffhausen and Kreuzlingen, via Konstanz.

== Religion ==
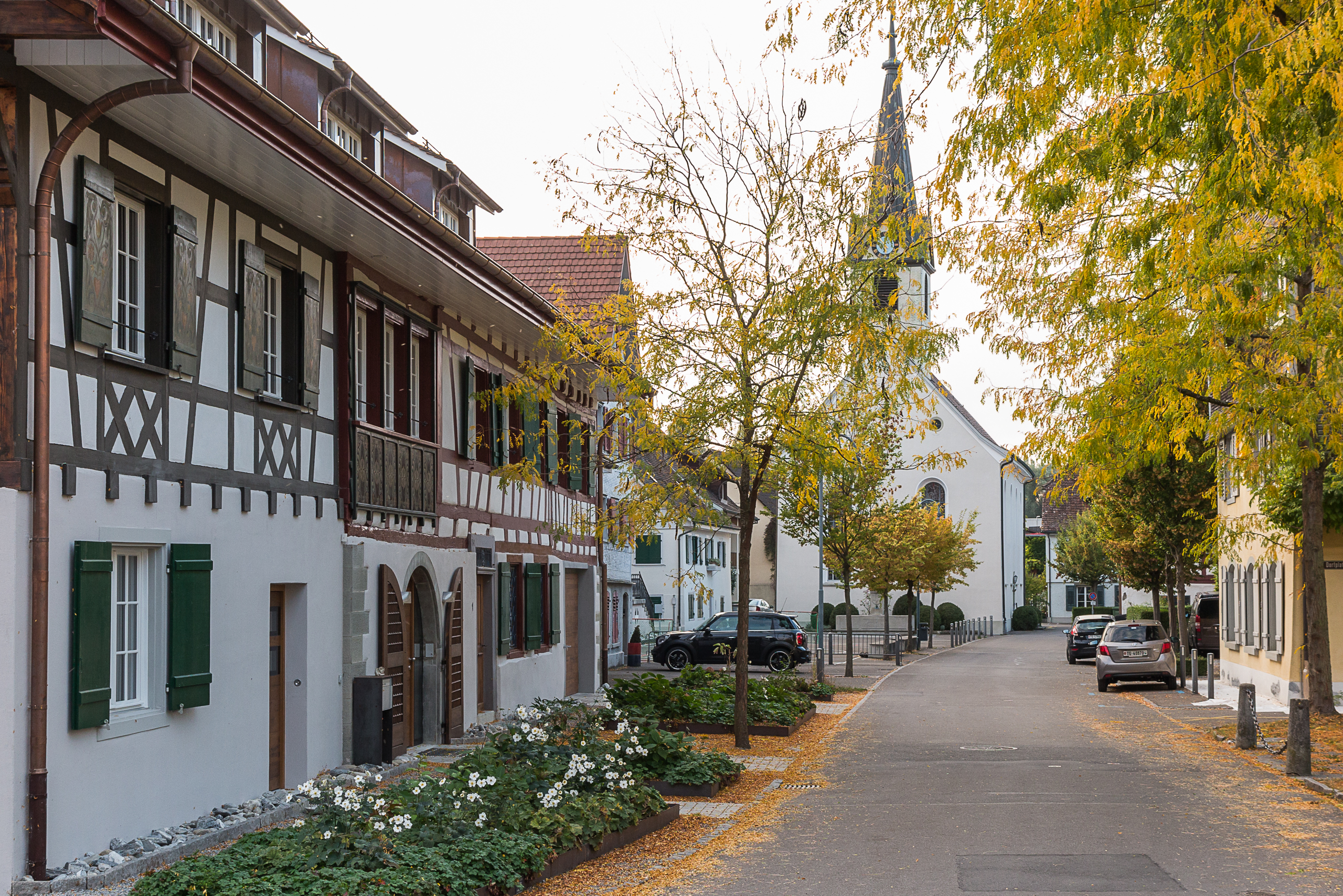
Church street and Reformed Church

From the 2000 census, 87 or 28.6% were Roman Catholic, while 161 or 53.0% belonged to the Swiss Reformed Church. Of the rest of the population, there are 2 individuals (or about 0.66% of the population) who belong to the Orthodox Church, and there is 1 individual who belongs to another Christian church. There were 9 (or about 2.96% of the population) who are Islamic. There are 1 individuals (or about 0.33% of the population) who belong to another church (not listed on the census), 41 (or about 13.49% of the population) belong to no church, are agnostic or atheist, and 2 individuals (or about 0.66% of the population) did not answer the question.

== Education ==
The entire Swiss population is generally well educated. In Gottlieben about 82.8% of the population (between age 25 and 64) have completed either non-mandatory upper secondary education or additional higher education (either university or a Fachhochschule).

Gottlieben is home to the Götighofen primary school district. In the 2008/2009 school year there were 52 students. There were 14 children in the kindergarten, and the average class size was 14 kindergartners. Of the children in kindergarten, 10 or 71.4% were female, 2 or 14.3% were not Swiss citizens. The lower and upper primary levels begin at about age 5-6 and last for 6 years. There were 18 children in who were at the lower primary level and 20 children in the upper primary level. The average class size in the primary school was 19 students. At the lower primary level, there were 8 children or 44.4% of the total population who were female. In the upper primary level, there were 6 or 30.0% who were female, and 2 or 10.0% did not speak German natively.
