= List of rivers of Germany =

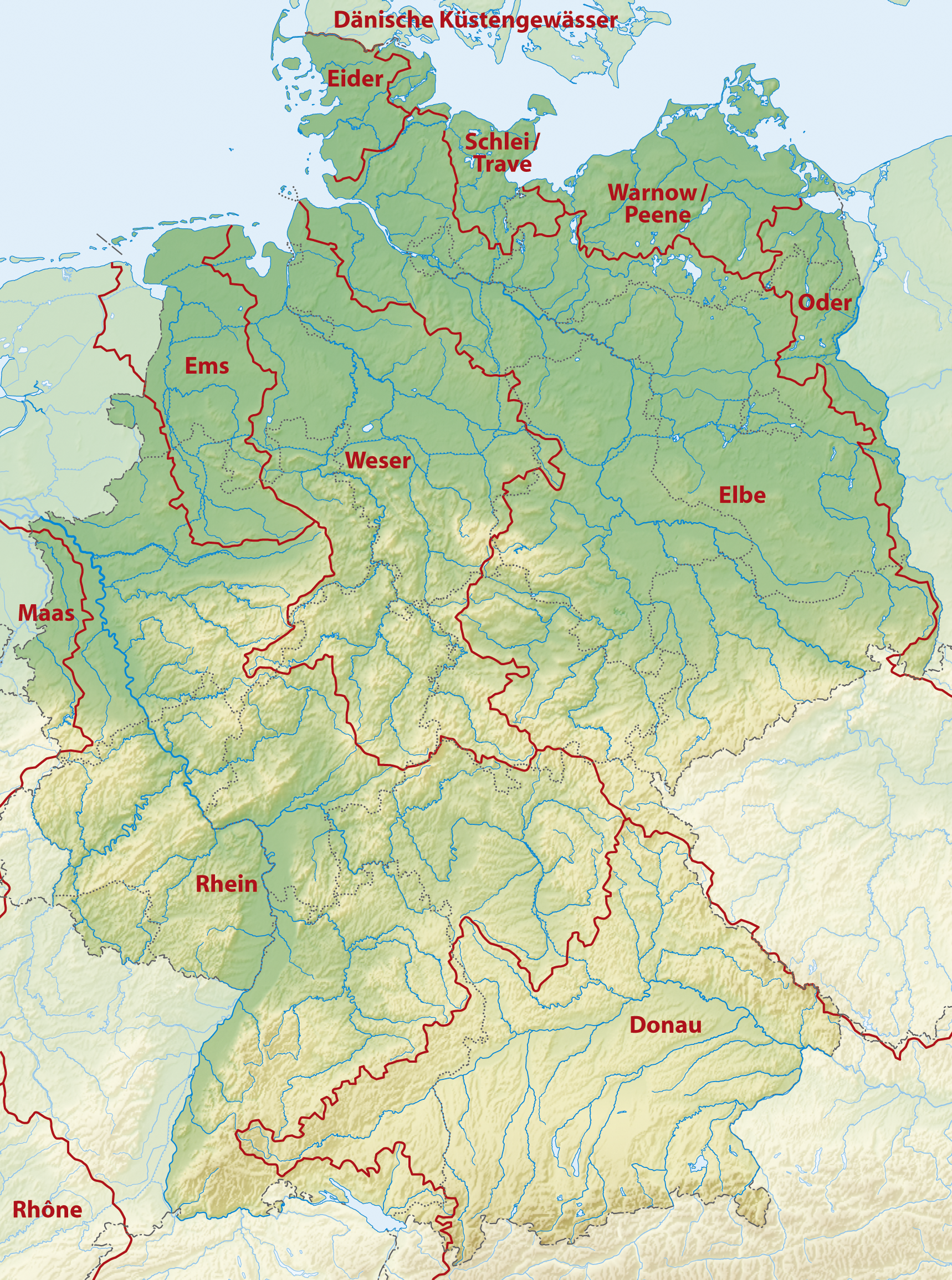
Drainage basins of Germany (red lines indicate watersheds)

The rivers listed here are either entirely or partially located in Germany, or form the country's international borders. The rivers of Germany flow into either the Baltic Sea (Ostsee), the Black Sea or the North Sea (Nordsee).

The main rivers of Germany include:

- flowing into the Baltic Sea: Oder
- flowing into the Black Sea: Danube (and its main tributaries Inn, Isar, and Lech)
- flowing into the North Sea: Rhine (and its main tributaries Moselle, Main and Neckar), Weser and Elbe (and its main tributaries Havel and Saale)

An alphabetical list of all German rivers that have an article in Wikipedia appears at the end of the article.

== Sorted by drainage basin ==
Rivers that flow into the sea are sorted geographically, along the coast. Rivers that flow into other rivers are sorted by the proximity of their points of confluence to the sea (the lower in the list, the more upstream).

Some rivers (the Meuse, for example) do not flow through Germany themselves, but they are mentioned for having German tributaries. They appear in italics.

For clarity, only rivers that are longer than 50 kilometres (31 mi) (or have longer tributaries) are included in this section; see the § Alphabetical list below for a more comprehensive list).

=== Draining into the Baltic Sea ===
The rivers in this section are sorted northwest (Danish border) to east (Polish border) and drain into the Baltic Sea:

- Schwentine (in Kiel)
- Trave (in Lübeck-Travemünde)
  - Stepenitz (near Travemünde)
- Warnow (in Warnemünde)
  - Nebel (in Bützow)
- Recknitz (in Ribnitz-Damgarten)
- Peenestrom (in Peenemünde)
  - Peene (near Anklam)
    - Tollense (in Demmin)
  - branch of river Oder (from Oder Lagoon)
- Świna/Swine (in Świnoujście, Poland)
  - Uecker (into Oder Lagoon in Ueckermünde)
  - Oder (into Oder Lagoon near Szczecin, Poland)
    - Lusatian Neisse (Lausitzer Neiße) (near Eisenhüttenstadt)

=== Draining into the Black Sea ===
These rivers drain into the Black Sea:

- Danube (in Sulina, Romania)
  - Inn (in Passau)
    - Rott (in Schärding)
    - Rott (in Rott am Inn)
    - Salzach (in Haiming)
      - Saalach (in Freilassing)
    - Alz (in Marktl)
      - Chiemsee (in Seebruck)
        - Tiroler Achen (in Grabenstätt)
    - Isen (in Neuötting)
    - Mangfall (in Rosenheim)
  - Ilz (in Passau)
  - Vils (in Vilshofen)
  - Isar (near Deggendorf)
    - Amper/Ammer (near Moosburg)
    - Loisach (near Wolfratshausen)
  - Große Laber (near Straubing)
  - Regen (in Regensburg)
    - Chamb (in Cham)
  - Naab (near Regensburg)
    - Vils (in Kallmünz)
  - Schwarze Laber (in Sinzing)
  - Altmühl (in Kelheim)
  - Abens (near Neustadt (Donau))
    - Ilm (near Neustadt (Donau))
  - Paar (near Vohburg)
  - Friedberger Ach (near Oberhausen)
  - Lech (near Donauwörth)
    - Wertach (in Augsburg)
  - Schmutter (in Donauwörth)
  - Zusam (in Donauwörth)
  - Wörnitz (in Donauwörth)
  - Brenz (in Lauingen)
  - Mindel (near Günzburg)
    - Kammel (near Offingen)
  - Günz (in Günzburg)
  - Iller (in Ulm)
  - Rot (in Erbach an der Donau)
  - Riß (near Ehingen)
  - Lauchert (near Sigmaringen)

=== Draining into the North Sea ===
The rivers in this section are sorted southwest (Netherlands) to east (Danish border) and drain into the North Sea:

- Maas (main branch at Stellendam, Netherlands)
  - Niers (in Gennep, Netherlands)
  - Rur/Roer (in Roermond, Netherlands)
    - Wurm (near Heinsberg)
    - Inde (in Jülich)
- Rhine/Rhein (main branch at Hook of Holland, Netherlands)
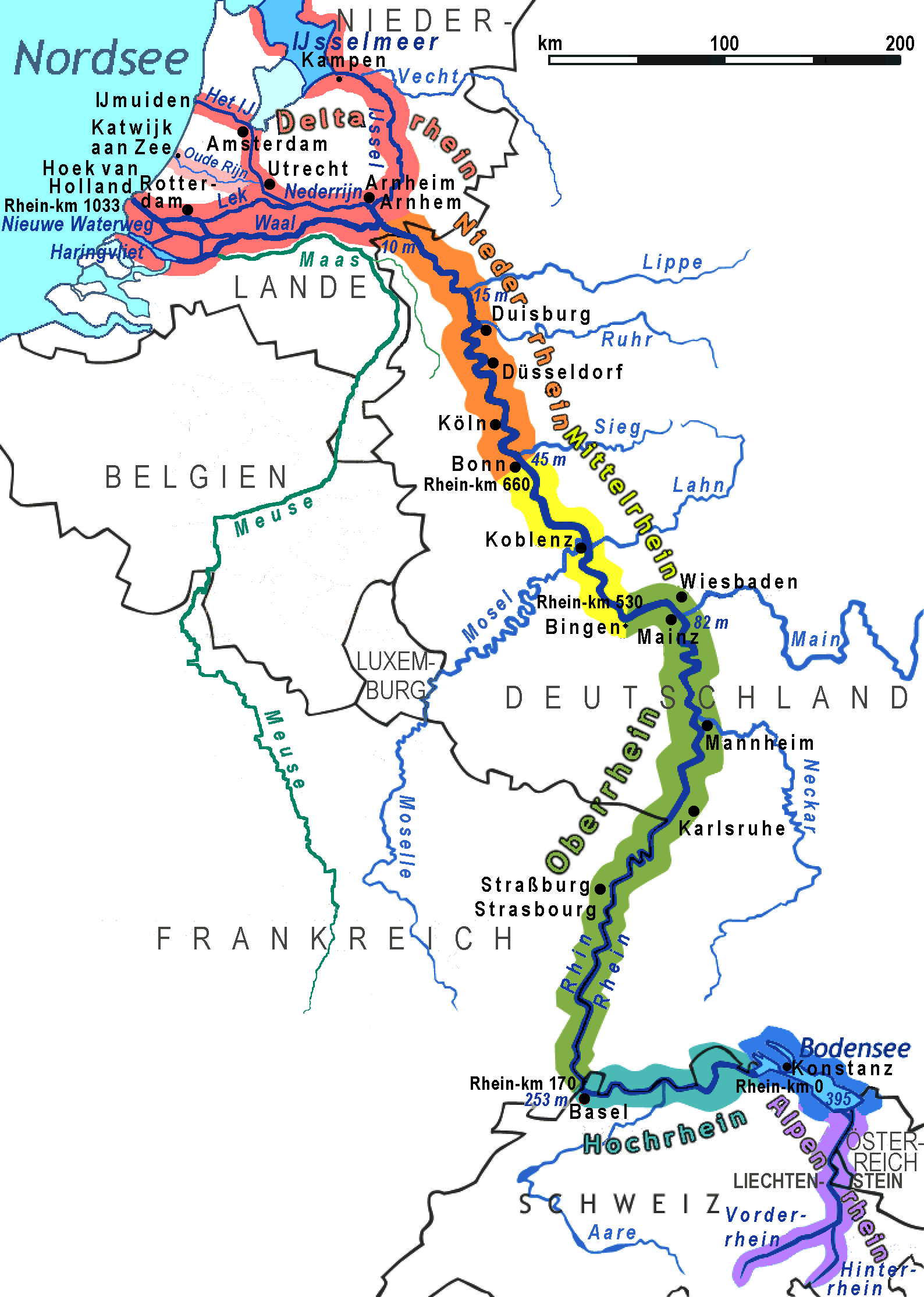
  Sections of the River Rhine: Rhine–Meuse–Scheldt delta Lower Rhine Middle Rhine Upper Rhine High Rhine Lake Constance (Untersee, Seerhein, Obersee) Alpine Rhine, Vorderrhein, Hinterrhein
  - Lower Rhine (from Bonn to North Sea)
    - Lippe (in Wesel)
      - Alme (in Paderborn)
    - Emscher (near Dinslaken)
    - Ruhr (in Duisburg)
      - Volme (near Hagen)
      - Lenne (near Hagen)
      - Möhne (in Neheim-Hüsten)
    - Erft (in Neuss)
    - Wupper/Wipper (in Leverkusen)
    - Sieg (in Bonn)
      - Agger (in Siegburg)
      - Nister (in Wissen)
  - Middle Rhine (from mouth of River Nahe to Bonn)
    - Ahr (near Sinzig)
    - Wied (in Neuwied)
    - Nette (between Weißenthurm and Andernach)
    - Moselle (in Koblenz)
      - Elzbach (in Moselkern)
      - Alf (in Alf)
      - Lieser (near Bernkastel-Kues)
      - Salm (near Klüsserath)
      - Kyll (near Trier-Ehrang)
      - Saar (near Konz)
        - Nied (near Rehlingen-Siersburg)
        - Prims (in Dillingen)
        - Blies (in Sarreguemines)
          - Schwarzbach (near Zweibrücken)
      - Sauer (in Wasserbillig)
        - Prüm (near Echternach)
          - Nims (in Irrel)
        - Our (in Wallendorf)
    - Königsbach (opposite of Niederlahnstein)
    - Lahn (in Lahnstein)
      - Aar (in Diez)
      - Weil (in Weilburg)
      - Dill (in Wetzlar)
      - Ohm (in Cölbe)
    - Nahe (in Bingen)
      - Alsenz (near Bad Kreuznach)
      - Glan (near Bad Sobernheim)
  - Upper Rhine (from Rhine knee in Basel to mouth of River Nahe)
    - Selz (in Ingelheim)
    - Main (in Mainz)
      - Nidda (in Frankfurt-Höchst)
        - Wetter (in Niddatal)
      - Kinzig (in Hanau)
      - Tauber (in Wertheim am Main)
      - Franconian Saale (in Gemünden am Main)
      - Regnitz (in Bamberg)
        - Pegnitz (in Fürth)
        - Rednitz (in Fürth)
          - Franconian Rezat (in Georgensgmünd)
          - Swabian Rezat (in Georgensgmünd)
      - Itz (in Baunach)
      - Red Main (near Kulmbach)
    - Neckar (in Mannheim)
      - Jagst (near Bad Friedrichshall)
      - Kocher (in Bad Friedrichshall)
      - Enz (in Besigheim)
        - Glems (near Markgröningen-Unterriexingen)
      - Murr (in Marbach am Neckar)
      - Rems (in Remseck)
      - Fils (in Plochingen)
    - Rehbach (between Altrip and Ludwigshafen)
    - Queich (near Germersheim)
    - Pfinz (near Germersheim)
    - Lauter (in Lauterbourg)
    - Murg (near Rastatt)
    - Sauer (in Seltz, France)
    - Acher (near Lichtenau)
    - Rench (near Lichtenau)
    - Kinzig (near Kehl)
      - Schutter (near Kehl)
    - Elz (near Lahr)
    - Kander (near Weil am Rhein)
    - Wiese (near Basel, Switzerland)
  - High Rhine (from Lake Constance to Rhine knee at Basel)
    - Wehra (near Bad Säckingen)
    - Murg (in Murg)
    - Alb (in Albbruck)
    - Wutach (in Waldshut-Tiengen)
      - Schlücht (in Waldshut-Tiengen)
      - Steina (in Waldshut-Tiengen)
      - Klingengraben (in Lauchringen)
        - Schwarzbach (near Lauchringen)
    - Biber (near Hemishofen, Switzerland)
  - Lake Constance (Bodensee)
    - Radolfzeller Aach (into Lower Lake Constance in Radolfzell)
    - Stockacher Aach (into Upper Lake Constance in Bodman-Ludwigshafen)
    - Seefelder Aach (into Upper Lake Constance in Uhldingen-Mühlhofen)
    - Brunnisach (into Upper Lake Constance near Friedrichshafen)
    - Rotach (into Upper Lake Constance in Friedrichshafen)
    - Schussen (into Upper Lake Constance in Eriskirch)
      - Scherzach (near Ravensburg)
      - Wolfegger Ach (near Weingarten)
    - Argen (into Upper Lake Constance in Langenargen)
      - Bollenbach (near Tettnang)
    - Leiblach (into Upper Lake Constance near Lindau; Austria–Germany border)
- IJssel (into the IJsselmeer near Kampen, Netherlands)
  - Berkel (in Zutphen, Netherlands)
  - Oude IJssel/Issel (in Doesburg, Netherlands)
- Zwarte Water (into the IJsselmeer near Genemuiden, Netherlands)
  - Vechte (near Zwolle, Netherlands)
    - Dinkel (in Neuenhaus)
- Ems (near Delfzijl, Netherlands)
  - Hase (in Meppen)
- Weser (near Bremerhaven)
  - Hunte (in Elsfleth)
  - Lesum (in Bremen-Vegesack)
    - Wümme (in Ritterhude)
  - Aller (near Verden (Aller))
    - Böhme (near Rethem)
    - Leine (near Schwarmstedt)
      - Innerste (near Sarstedt)
      - Rhume (in Northeim)
        - Oder (Harz) (in Katlenburg-Lindau)
    - Örtze (in Winsen)
    - Fuhse (in Celle)
    - Oker (in Müden (Aller))
      - Schunter (near Braunschweig)
  - Werre (in Bad Oeynhausen)
  - Diemel (in Bad Karlshafen)
  - Fulda (in Hann. Münden)
    - Eder (in Edermünde)
      - Schwalm (near Fritzlar)
    - Haune (in Bad Hersfeld)
  - Werra (in Hannoversch Münden)
    - Hörsel (near Eisenach)
    - Ulster (in Philippsthal)
- Elbe (near Cuxhaven)
  - Oste (near Otterndorf)
  - Stör (near Glückstadt)
  - Alster (in Hamburg)
  - Bille (near Hamburg)
  - Ilmenau (near Winsen (Luhe))
  - Jeetzel (in Hitzacker)
  - Löcknitz (near Dömitz)
    - Elde (near Lenzen)
  - Aland (in Schnackenburg)
  - Stepenitz (in Wittenberge)
  - Havel (near Havelberg)
    - Dosse (near Havelberg)
    - Rhin (near Warnau)
    - Plane (near Brandenburg)
    - Nuthe (in Potsdam)
    - Spree (in Berlin-Spandau)
      - Dahme (in Berlin-Köpenick)
  - Ohre (near Burg)
  - Saale (in Barby)
    - Bode (in Nienburg (Saale))
    - Wipper (Saale) (near Bernburg)
    - White Elster (near Halle (Saale))
      - Parthe (in Leipzig)
      - Pleiße (in Leipzig)
      - Weida (near Gera)
    - Unstrut (near Naumburg)
      - Helme (near Kalbsrieth)
        - Ichte (near Pützlingen)
      - Wipper (near Heldrungen)
      - Gera (in Straußfurt)
    - Ilm (in Großheringen)
    - Schwarza (in Schwarza)
  - Mulde (in Dessau)
    - Zwickauer Mulde (near Colditz)
      - Chemnitz (near Wechselburg)
    - Freiberger Mulde (near Colditz)
      - Zschopau (near Döbeln)
  - Black Elster (near Wittenberg)
  - Weißeritz (in Dresden)
    - Wild Weißeritz (in Freital)
  - Wesenitz (in Pirna)
  - Ohře/Eger (in Litoměřice, Czech Republic)
  - Vltava (in Mělník, Czech Republic)
    - Berounka (near Prague, Czech Republic)
      - Mže/Mies (in Plzeň, Czech Republic)
- Eider (in Tönning)
  - Treene (in Friedrichstadt)

== Alphabetical list ==
=== A–E ===
- Aabach
- Aar
- Abens
- Acher
- Agger
- Ahr
- Aland
- Alb (High Rhine)
- Alb (Upper Rhine)
- Alf
- Aller
- Alme
- Alsenz
- Alster
- Altmühl
- Alz
- Ammer (Neckar)
- Ammer/Amper
- Argen
- Aue (Elbe)
- Aue (Suhle)
- Berkel
- Bever
- Biber (Danube)
- Biber (Rhine)
- Biela
- Bille
- Bist
- Black Elster
- Blau
- Blies
- Bode
- Böhme
- Bollenbach
- Breg
- Breitach
- Brend
- Brenz
- Brigach
- Brunnisach
- Chamb
- Chemnitz
- Dahme
- Danube
- Diemel
- Dill
- Dinkel
- Dosse
- Dreisam
- Düssel
- Echaz
- Eder
- Eider
- Elbe
- Elde
- Else
- Elz (Neckar)
- Elz (Rhine)
- Elzbach
- Ems
- Emscher
- Ennepe
- Enz
- Enz (Prüm)
- Erft

=== F–K ===
- Feller Bach
- Fils
- Franconian Rezat
- Franconian Saale
- Freiberger Mulde
- Friedberger Ach
- Fuhse
- Fulda
- Garte
- Gera
- Glan
- Gose/Abzucht
- Gottleuba
- Große Laber
- Günz
- Hamme
- Hase
- Haune
- Havel
- Heller
- Helme
- Hönne
- Hörsel
- Hunte
- Ichte
- Ihme
- Iller
- Ilm (Bavaria)
- Ilm (Thuringia)
- Ilmenau
- Ilz
- Inde
- Inn
- Innerste
- Isar
- Isen
- Itz
- Jade
- Jagst
- Jeetzel
- Kammel
- Kander
- Kinzig (Main)
- Kinzig (Rhine)
- Klingengraben
- Kocher
- Königsbach
- Kyll

=== L–O ===
- Lahn
- Lauchert
- Lauter (Glan)
- Lauter (Rhine)
- Lech
- Leda
- Leibi
- Leiblach
- Leine
- Lenne
- Lesum
- Lieser
- Lippe
- Löcknitz
- Loisach
- Lusatian Neisse
- Lutter (Lachte)
- Lutter (Leine)
- Lutter (Oder)
- Main
- Mandau
- Mangfall
- Maurine
- Mindel
- Möhne
- Moselle
- Mulde
- Münstersche Aa
- Murg (Northern Black Forest)
- Murg (Southern Black Forest)
- Murr
- Mže/Mies
- Naab
- Nahe
- Nebel
- Neckar
- Neetze
- Nette (Innerste)
- Nette (Niers)
- Nette (Middle Rhine)
- Nidda
- Nied
- Niers
- Nims
- Nister
- Nuthe
- Oder
- Oder (Harz)
- Ohm
- Ohre
- Ohře/Eger
- Oker
- Orla
- Örtze
- Oste
- Oude IJssel
- Our

=== P–S ===
- Paar
- Pader
- Parthe
- Peene
- Pegnitz
- Pfinz
- Plane
- Pleiße
- Prims
- Prüm
- Queich
- Radolfzeller Aach
- Recknitz
- Red Main
- Rednitz
- Red Weißeritz
- Regen
- Regnitz
- Rehbach
- Rems
- Rench
- Rheider Au
- Rhin
- Rhine
- Rhume
- Riß
- Rot
- Rotach
- Rott (Inn, Neuhaus am Inn)
- Rott (Inn, Rott am Inn)
- Ruhr
- Rur
- Ruwer
- Ryck
- Saalach
- Saale
- Saar
- Salm
- Salza (Saale)
- Salza (Unstrut)
- Salzach
- Sauer
- Sauer (Rhine)
- Scheppau
- Scherzach
- Schlücht
- Schmutter
- Schozach
- Schwarze Elster
- Schunter
- Schussen
- Schutter
- Schwalm (Eder)
- Schwalm (Meuse)
- Schwarza
- Schwarzbach (Blies)
- Schwarzbach (Klettgau)
- Schwarze Laber
- Schwentine
- Seefelder Aach
- Seeve
- Selbitz
- Selz
- Sieg
- Soeste
- Spree
- Sprotte
- Steina
- Stepenitz (Elbe)
- Stepenitz (Trave)
- Stockacher Aach
- Stör
- Sulm
- Swabian Rezat
- Swist

=== T–Z ===
- Tanger
- Tauber
- Tiroler Achen
- Tollense
- Trave
- Treene
- Uecker
- Ulster
- Unstrut
- Usa
- Vechte
- Vils (Danube)
- Vils (Lech)
- Vils (Naab)
- Volme
- Wakenitz
- Warnow
- Weida
- Weil
- Wehra
- Weißeritz
- Werra
- Werre
- Wertach
- Wesenitz
- Weser
- Westfälische Aa
- Wetter
- White Elster
- White Main
- Wied
- Wiese
- Wild Weißeritz
- Wipper (Saale)
- Wipper (Unstrut)
- Wisper
- Wolfegger Ach
- Wörnitz
- Wümme
- Wupper
- Würm (Amper)
- Würm (Nagold)
- Wurm
- Wutach
- Zaber
- Zeegenbach
- Zschopau
- Zusam
- Zwickauer Mulde

== By state ==
- List of rivers of Baden-Württemberg
- List of rivers of Bavaria
- List of rivers of Brandenburg
- List of rivers of Berlin
- List of rivers of Bremen
- List of rivers of Hesse
- List of rivers of Lower Saxony
- List of rivers of Mecklenburg-Vorpommern
- List of rivers of North Rhine-Westphalia
- List of rivers of Rhineland-Palatinate
- List of rivers of Saarland
- List of rivers of Saxony
- List of rivers of Saxony-Anhalt
- List of rivers of Schleswig-Holstein
- List of rivers of Thuringia
