= Lake Überlingen =

Coordinates: 47°47′N 9°06′E

Location of Lake Überlingen in Lake Constance

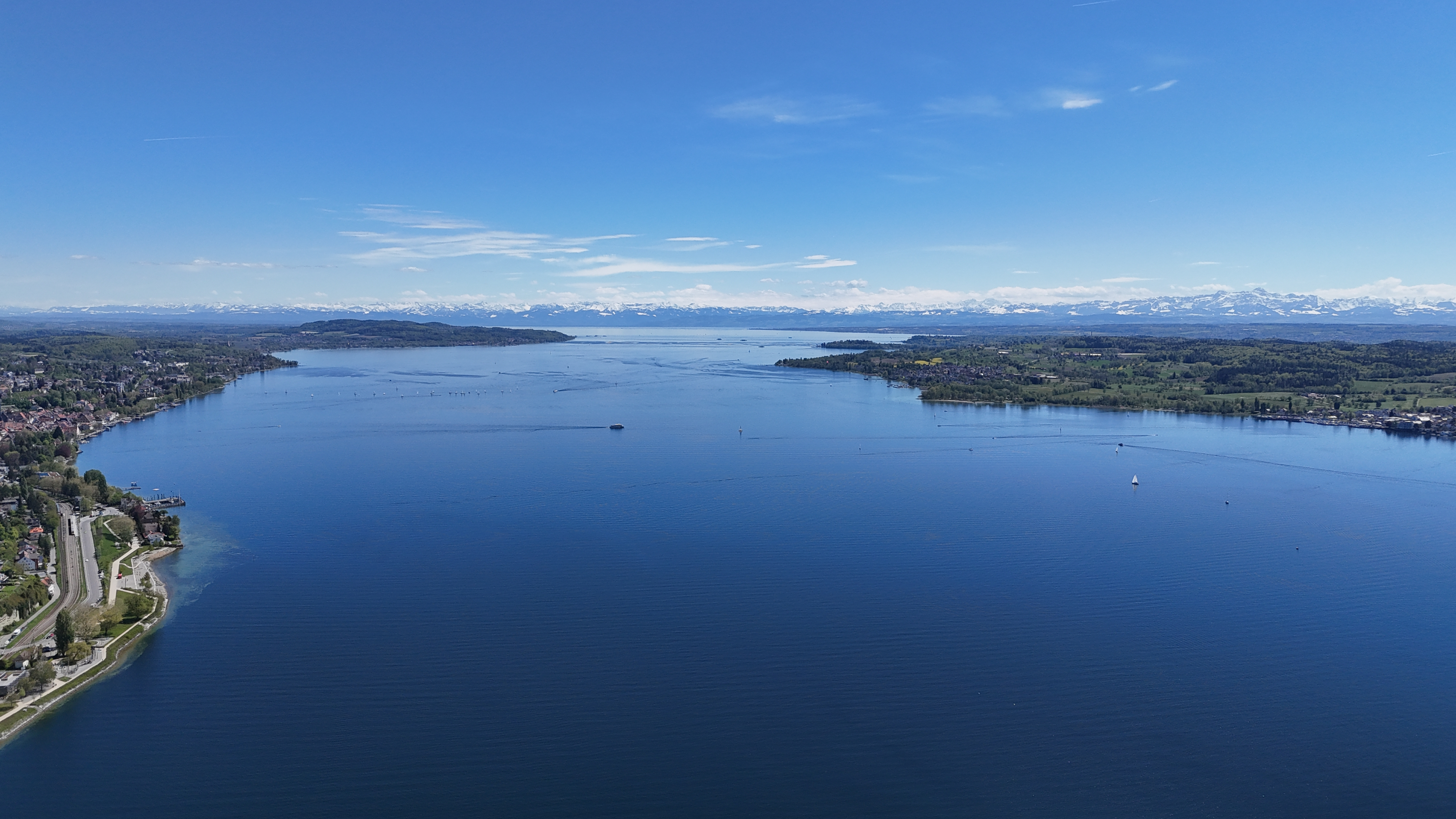
Lake Überlingen in 2024

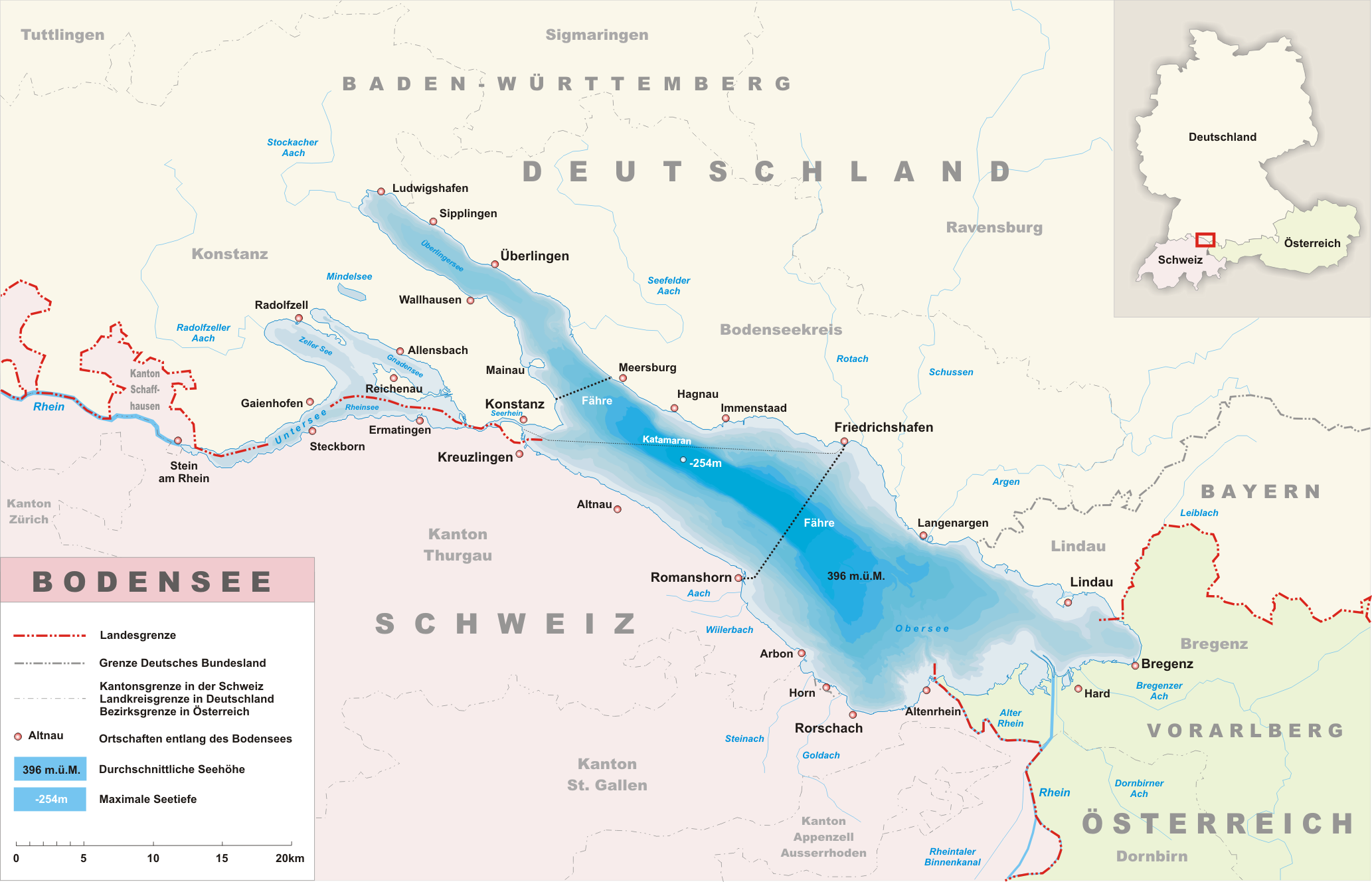
The boundary between Lake Überlingen and the rest of Lake Constance more or less coincides with the route of the ferry service from Meersburg to Constance

Lake Überlingen (Standard German of Germany: Überlinger See, Swiss Standard German: Überlingersee) is the northwestern "finger" of the Obersee, the lower part of Lake Constance. The boundary of lake is defined as the ferry link from Meersburg to Constance. It extends north to Bodman-Ludwigshafen.

In contrast to the main south-eastern part of the Upper Lake, which is a condominium, Lake Überlingen is considered German territory.

The total area of Lake Obersee is about 473 km^{2}; with its 61 km^{2}, Lake Überlingen is about as large as the Untersee part of the lake. The elevation of the water surface is about 395 m above sea level. The maximum depth of Lake Überlingen of 147 m is significantly lower than that of rest of the Obersee with 254 m.

Mainau, the Island of Flowers, is on the Constance side of Lake Überlingen. Neighboring municipalities are Meersburg, Überlingen, Uhldingen-Mühlhofen and Sipplingen in Bodenseekreis as well as Allensbach, Bodman-Ludwigshafen and the city of Constance in the Landkreis of Constance.

The Seefeld Aach in Uhldingen flows into Lake Überlingen in Uhldingen, and the Stockacher Aach between Bodman and Ludwigshafen. Several smaller streams also flow into the lake.

The intake point of the Bodensee-Wasserversorgung is in Sipplingen, at a depth of approximately 60 m. This firm supplies about 4 million people in many parts of Baden-Württemberg with drinking water, producing about 135 million m^{3} annually. This represents approximately 1.25% of the discharge.

Like the rest of Lake Constance, Lake Überlingen is a popular water sports area. Because of its steep banks, it is also a popular scuba diving area. It is, however, dangerous: the banks drop off steeply to about 60 m, visibility is limited, the currents often change and the water temperature in the deeper parts is only 4-5 °C. Novice divers drown almost every year.

== Geology ==
Lake Überlingen with its steep bank walls is a rift valley, created during the folding that created the Alps. Its final shape emerged during the Würm ice age, when the Rhine Glacier gouged out the whole of Lake Constance from south-east. The rocky walls are made of molasse, a tertiary sandstone, which is quite soft, in accordance with its relatively young age.

During a temporarily stable withdrawal stage of the Rhine glacier (the "Constance stage"), most of the Obersee was still covered by the glacier, the Lake Überlingen was already free of ice, so it was a glacial lake at the end of a glacier; icebergs floated on the lake after breaking off from the glacier. At that time there was an outflow, and thus the source of the Rhine, at the northwest end of Lake Überlingen, near Bodman-Ludwigshafen, in the direction of Radolfzell. This created a valley that is still clearly visible between the Radolfzell districts of Stahringen and Reute.
