= Obersee (Lake Constance) =

Lake in Austria, Germany and Switzerland

Upper Lake Constance (Obersee)
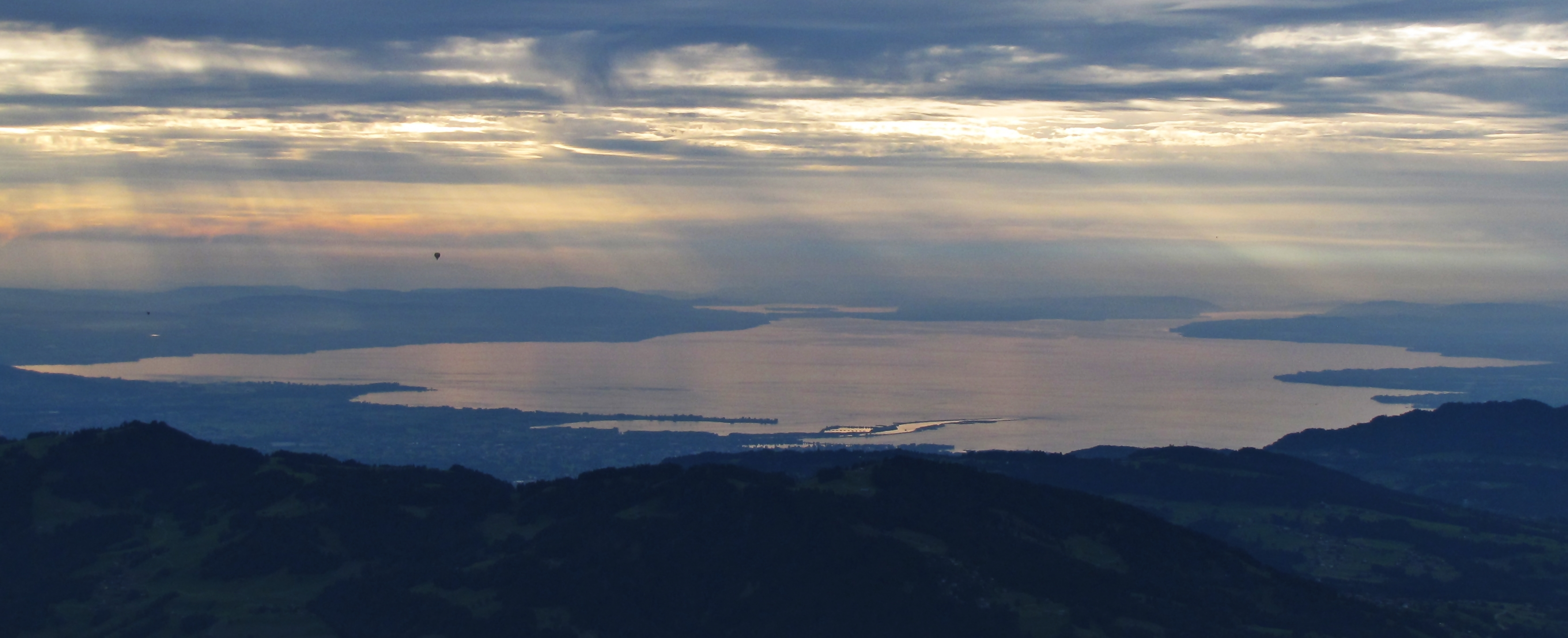
- View over Lake Constance's Obersee from Winterstaude mountain at dusk

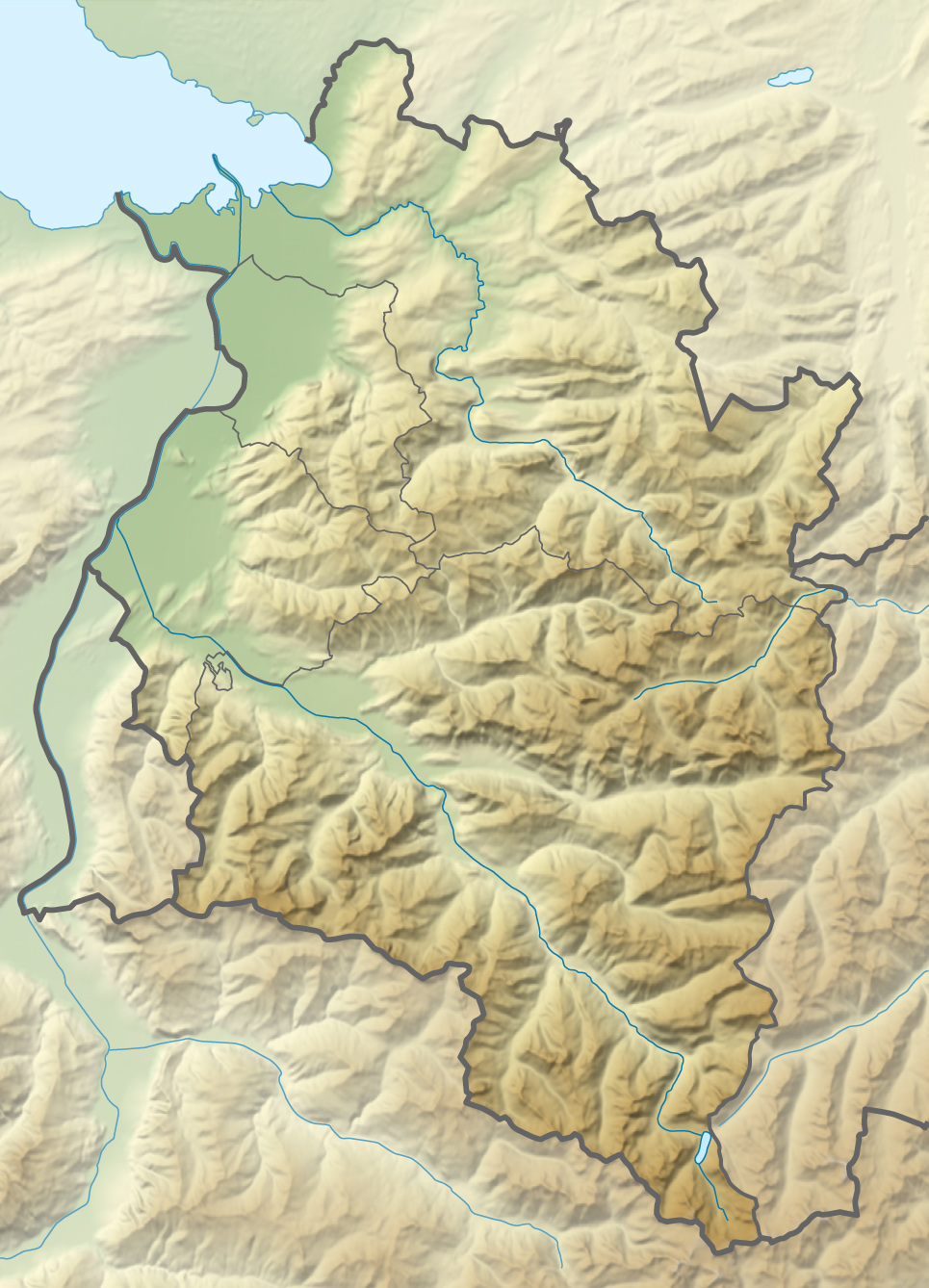
- Location within Canton of St. Gallen Location within Switzerland Location within Baden-Württemberg Location within Germany Location within Austria Location within Vorarlberg Location within Alps
- Interactive map of Upper Lake Constance (Obersee)
- Location: Tripoint of Germany, Austria and Switzerland
- Coordinates: 47°37′N 9°26′E
- Primary inflows: Alpine Rhine, Bregenzer Ach, Argen, Alter Rhein (Fußacher Durchstich), Schussen, Dornbirner Ach, Seefelder Aach, Rotach, Stockacher Aach and smaller streams
- Primary outflows: Seerhein
- Max. length: 63 kilometres (39 mi)
- Max. width: 14 kilometres (8.7 mi)
- Surface area: 472 square kilometres (182 sq mi)
- Average depth: 101 metres (331 ft)
- Max. depth: 251 metres (823 ft)
- Water volume: 47.6 cubic kilometres (11.4 cu mi)
- Shore length^{1}: 186 kilometres (116 mi)
- Surface elevation: 395.33 metres (1,297.0 ft)
- Islands: Lindau, Mainau
- Settlements: Überlingen, Meersburg, Friedrichshafen, Lindau, Bregenz, Rorschach, Konstanz
- ^{1} Shore length is not a well-defined measure.

The Obersee (German pronunciation: [ˈoːbɐzeː], lit. 'Upper Lake'), also known as Upper Lake Constance, is the much larger of the two parts of Lake Constance, the other part being the Untersee (English: Lower Lake). The two parts are separated by the Bodanrück peninsula. The narrow, northwestern branch of Obersee is also called Überlinger See (English: Lake Überlingen).

== Geography ==
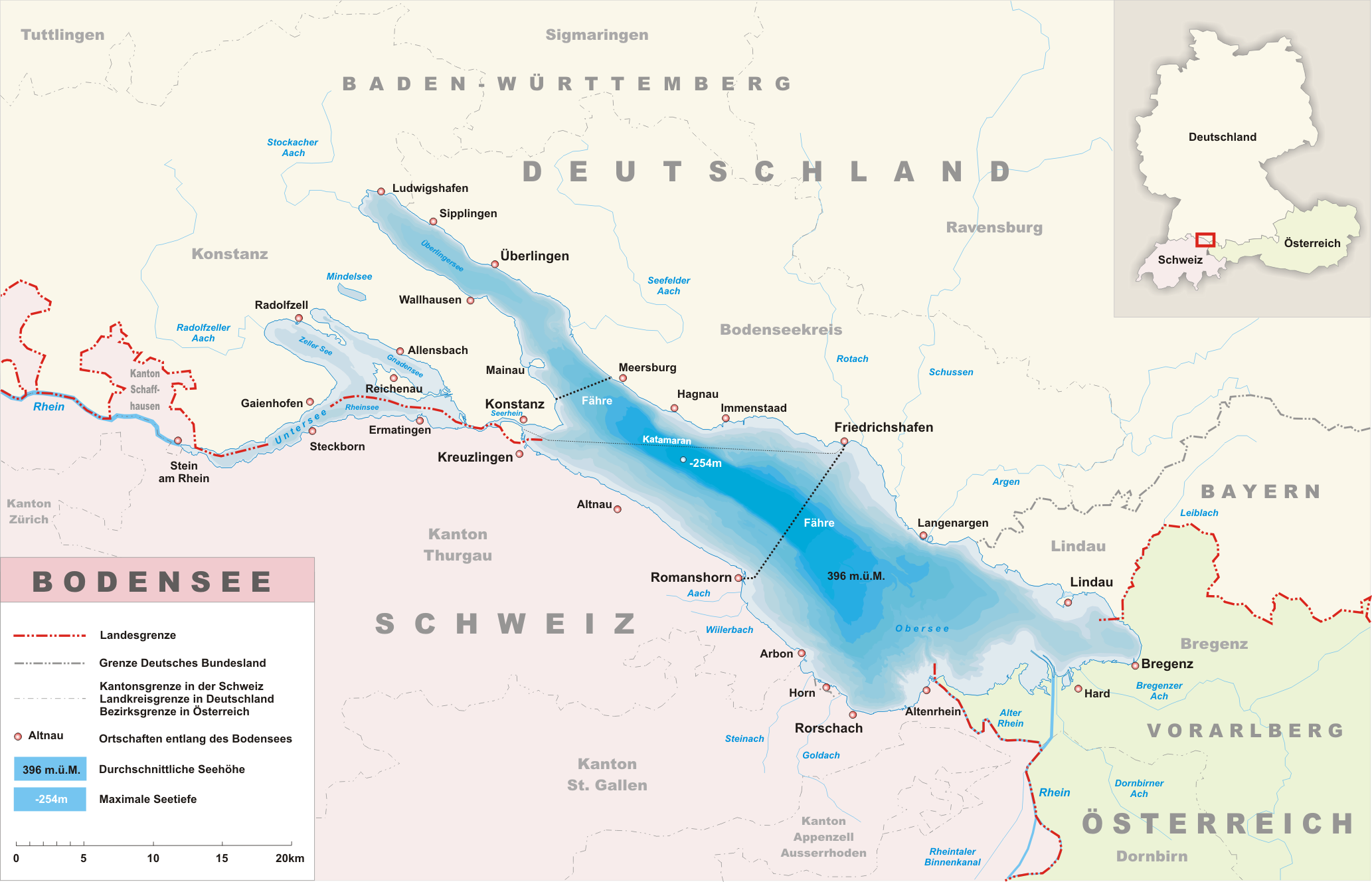
The "Obersee" is the larger, eastern, part of Lake Constance

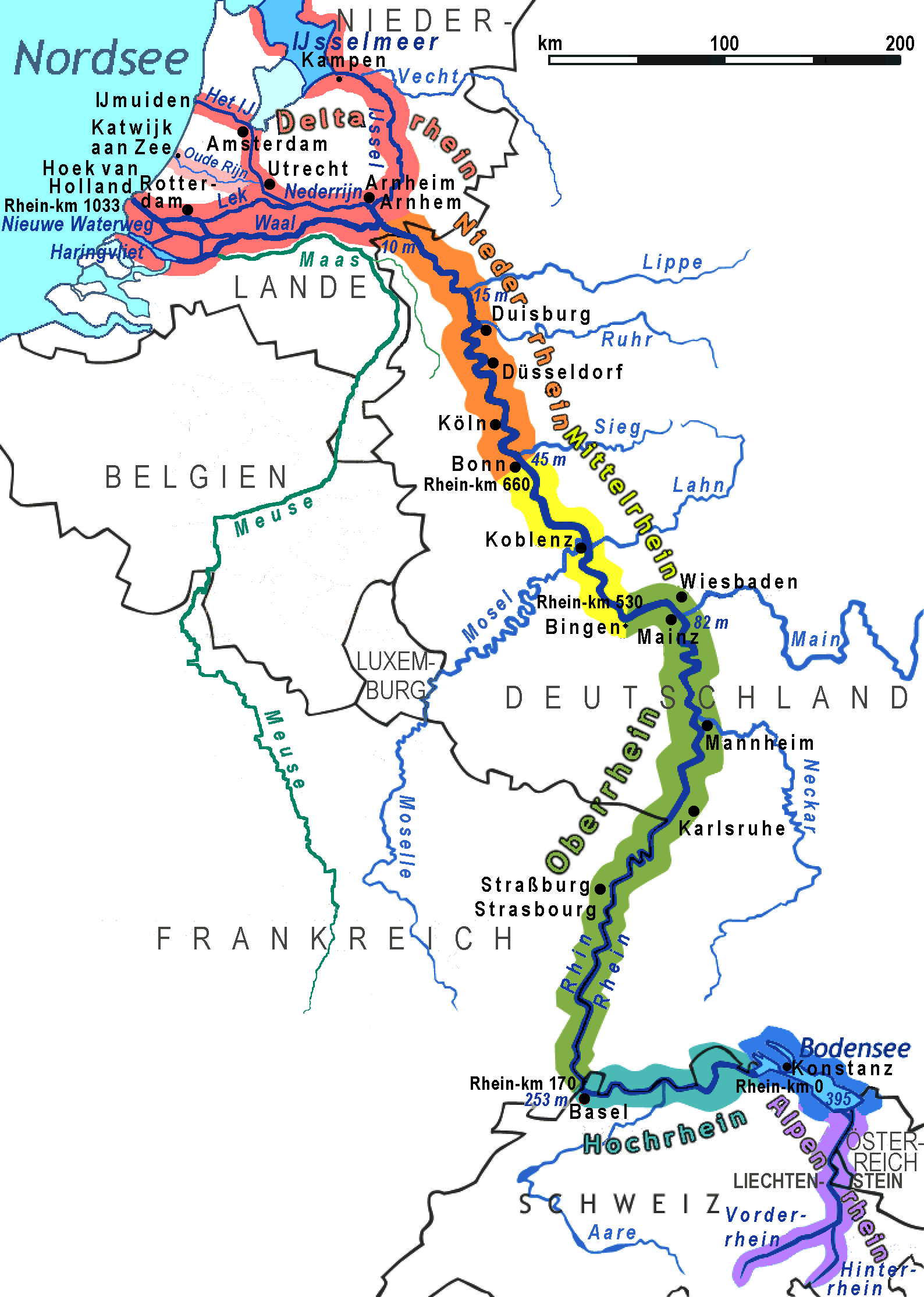
Sections of the Rhine: Rhine–Meuse–Scheldt delta Lower Rhine Middle Rhine Upper Rhine High Rhine Lake Constance (Untersee, Seerhein, Obersee) Alpine Rhine, Vorderrhein, Hinterrhein Rhine sources

The Obersee has an area of 473 km^{2} (183 sq mi) in size and extends for 63 km (39 mi) between Bregenz in the Southeast and Bodman-Ludwigshafen in the Northwest. Its maximum width is 14 km (8.7 mi). Its main inflow is the Alpine Rhine, with other tributaries being the Dornbirner Ach, Bregenzer Ach, Leiblach, Argen, Schussen, Rotach, Seefelder Aach, Stockacher Aach and Aach. At Konstanz (Constance), it drains through the Seerhein into the Untersee.

The distinctive, northwestern arm and 21 square kilometres (8.1 sq mi)-large Lake Überlingen (Standard German of Germany: Überlinger See), named after Überlingen, is part of the Upper Lake Constance, as well as the Bay of Bregenz, and the Constance Hopper.

The countries that border the lake are Switzerland, with its cantons of Thurgau and St. Gallen, Austria, with its federal state of Vorarlberg, and Germany, with its federal states of Baden-Württemberg and Bavaria. The exact location of the border between the riparian states within the south-eastern part of Obersee have never been jointly agreed upon (see Lake Constance); only the smaller northwestern water of Lake Überlingen is completely within German territory.

The southeastern end of the lake borders the Alps, the Appenzell Alps of Switzerland and the Allgäu Alps of Austria and Germany. A notable mountain with outlook is the Pfänder above Bregenz.

== Origin of the name ==
The Romans called it Lacus Venetus, Lacus Brigantinus and Lacus Constantinus. In the Middle Ages the dominant term was Lacus Bodamicus, or in German Bodensee. Gradually, this name began to include the Lower Lake (Lacus Acronius), so the term "Upper Lake" was introduced for the larger lake.

== See also ==
- Untersee (Lake Constance)
- Seerhein
- Bodanrück
- Lake Constance Belt Railway
