= J. Metzler =

German painter

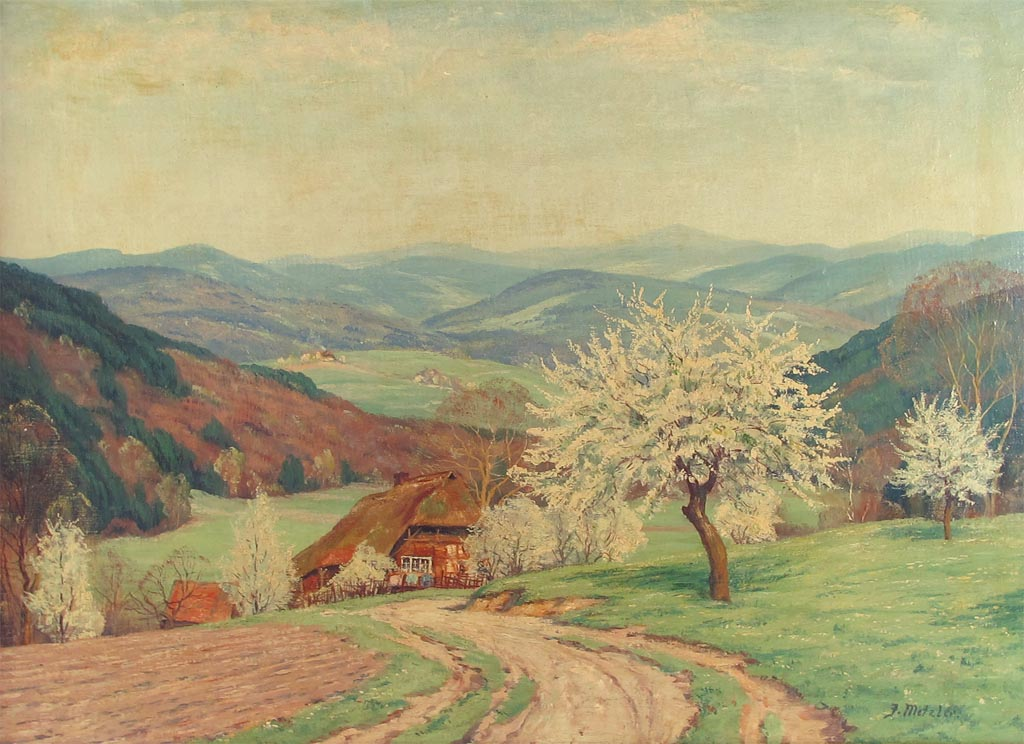
Landscape in the black forest

J. Metzler was a German artist of the Düsseldorf school. His works were made between the last decades of the 19th century and the first decades of the 20th century and were very popular at that time. He was specialised in Landscape art and painted mostly the Rhine valleys (especially the Lower Rhine near Düsseldorf) but also landscapes everywhere in Germany. Until today the identity of this famous painter of the past remains unknown; one proposed identity is the landscape painter Johann Jungblut.
