= Sissle =

River in Switzerland

Sissle German: Sisslen
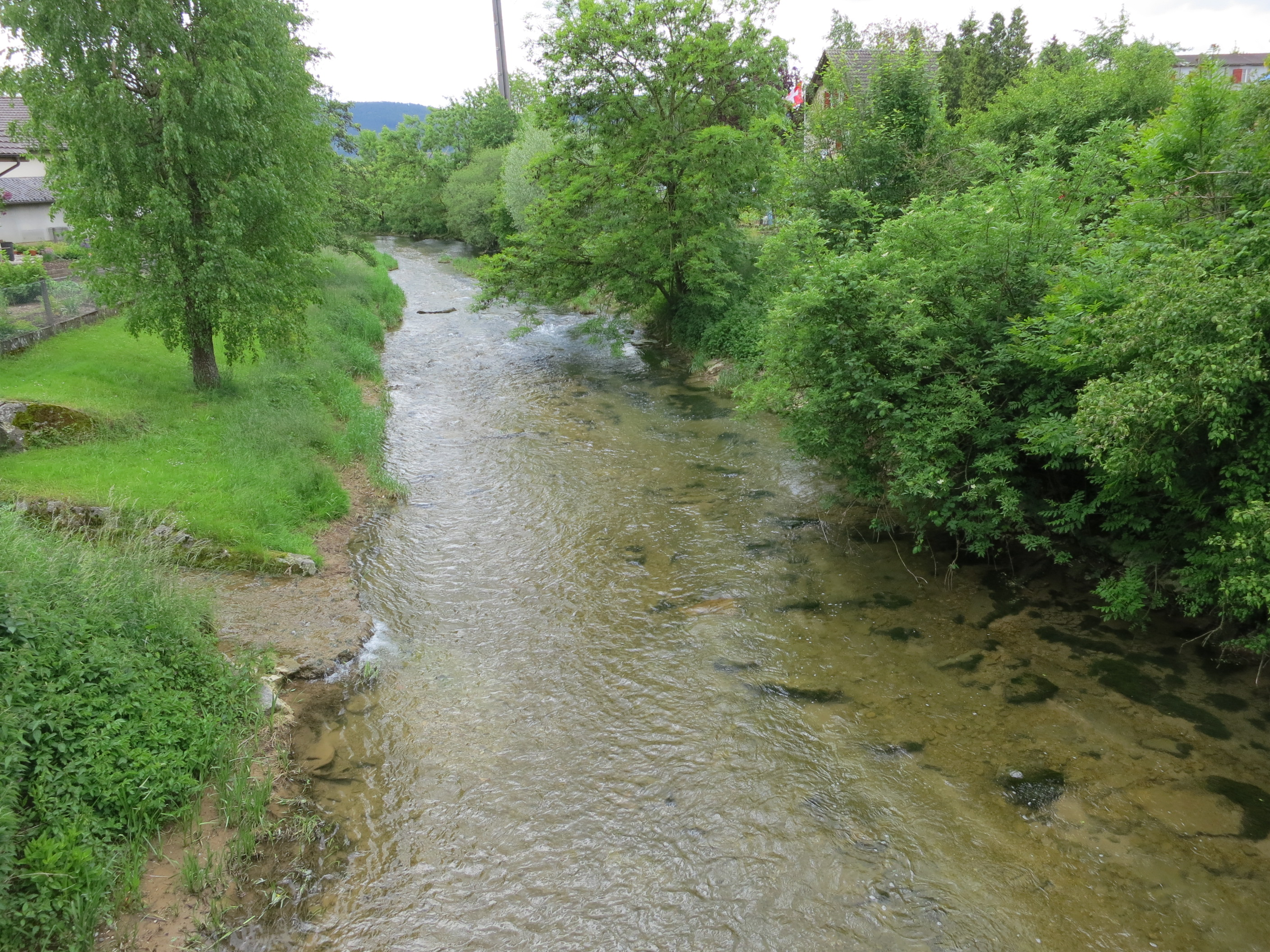
- Native name: Sissle (German)

Location
- Country: Switzerland
- Canton: Aargau
- District: Laufenburg District

Physical characteristics
- Source
  - location: South slope of Mount Dreierberg, Schinznach-Dorf
  - elevation: 650 m (2,130 ft)
- Mouth
  - location: Confluence with High Rhine at Sisseln,
  - coordinates: 47°33′15″N 7°58′54″E
  - elevation: 290 m (950 ft)
- Length: 16 km (9.9 mi)

Basin features
- Progression: Rhine→ North Sea

The Sissle (Swiss German, German: Sisslen) is a 16-kilometre (10 mi) long river in the Swiss canton of Aargau in Switzerland. It is a tributary of the Rhine and drains the eastern part of the Fricktal. The largest town on the river is Frick.

The river rises in the municipalities of Schinznach-Dorf and Thalheim at an elevation of 650 metres (2,130 ft) above sea level on the southern slope of Mount Dreierberg and the northern slope of Mount Zeiher Homberg, in the Jura Mountains. Shortly after the source, the river breaks through a water gap between the Dreierberg mountain and the Zeiher Homberg and then falls off rapidly. It passed the Talmatt and delimits the district Iberg of the municipality of Zeihen. After about 2.5 kilometres (1.6 mi), the Sissle flows past Effingen railway station and the west portal of the Bözberg railway tunnel, at an elevation of about 450 metres (1,480 ft). The river had to be canalized here when the railway was constructed.

From here on, the landscape is fairly flat and the river follows the A3 motorway. It flows freely until Hornussen and is then canalized until Eiken, where it changes direction from northwest to north, and enters the Rhine valley. It receives the left tributary Bruggbach, coming from Wittnau. The last 2.5 kilometres (1.6 mi) of the Sissle meander strongly. It ends at the village of Sisseln, where it flows into the High Rhine at an elevation of 290 metres (950 ft).

== See also ==
- List of rivers of Switzerland
