= Murg (Southern Black Forest) =

River in Germany

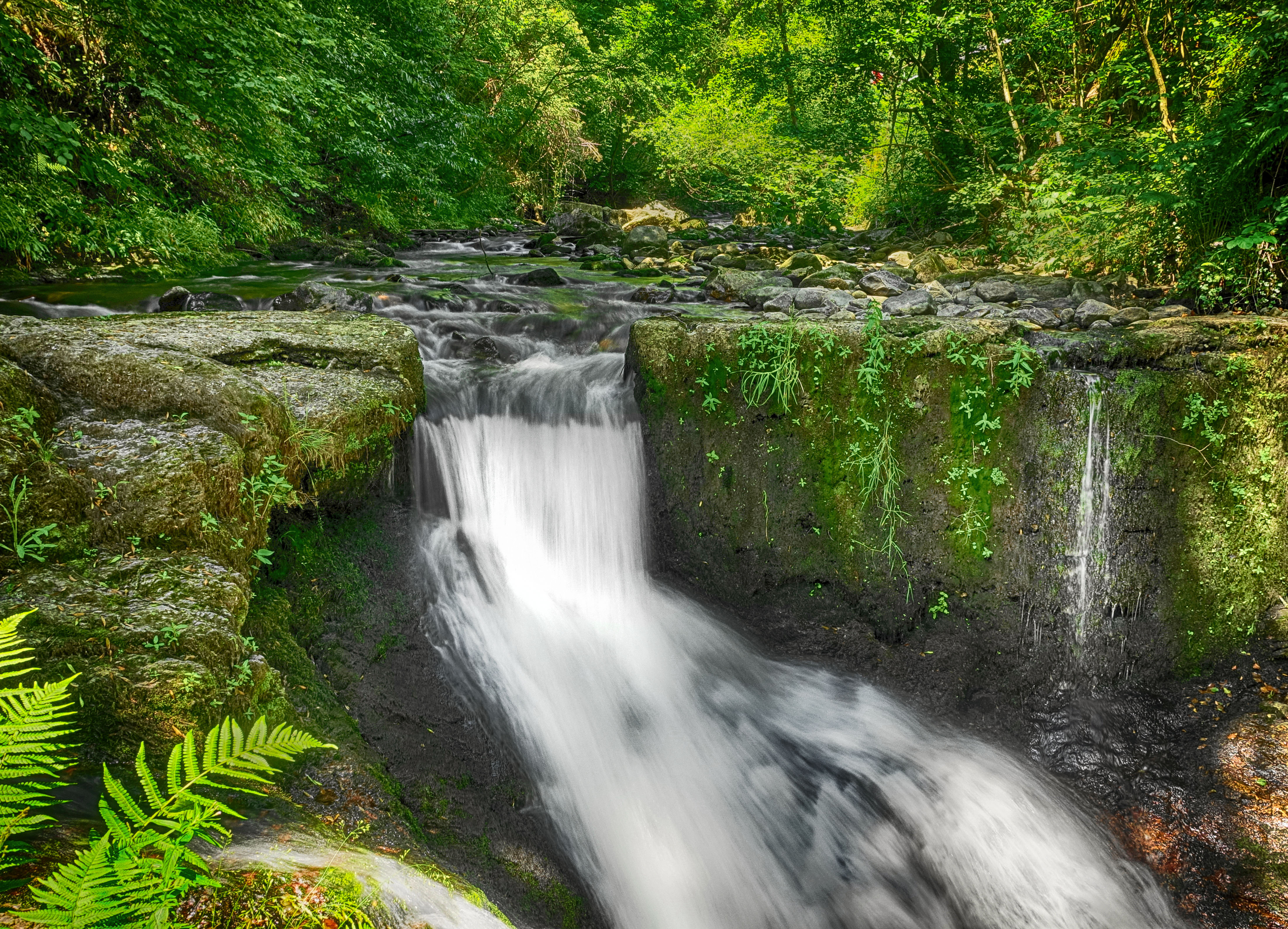

Location
- Country: Germany
- State: Baden-Württemberg

Physical characteristics
- Source
  - location: Southern Black Forest
- Mouth
  - location: at Murg into the High Rhine
  - coordinates: 47.5511°N 8.0231°E
- Length: 22.4 km (13.9 mi)

Basin features
- Progression: Rhine→ North Sea

The Murg (German pronunciation: [mʊʁk]) or Hauensteiner Murg is a river and right tributary of the High Rhine in the district of Waldshut in Baden-Württemberg in Germany. The Murg reaches the Rhine at the municipality of Murg.

== See also ==
- List of rivers of Germany
  - List of rivers of Baden-Württemberg
