= Kotbach =

River in Germany

Location
- Country: Germany
- States: Baden-Württemberg

Physical characteristics
- Mouth
  - location: Schwarzbach
  - coordinates: 47.6187°N 08.4618°E

Basin features
- Progression: Schwarzbach→ Klingengraben→ Wutach→ Rhine→ North Sea

Kotbach is a small river of Baden-Württemberg, Germany. It flows into the Schwarzbach near Dettighofen.

== See also ==
- List of rivers of Baden-Württemberg
