= Murg, Baden-Württemberg =

Murg
- Municipality
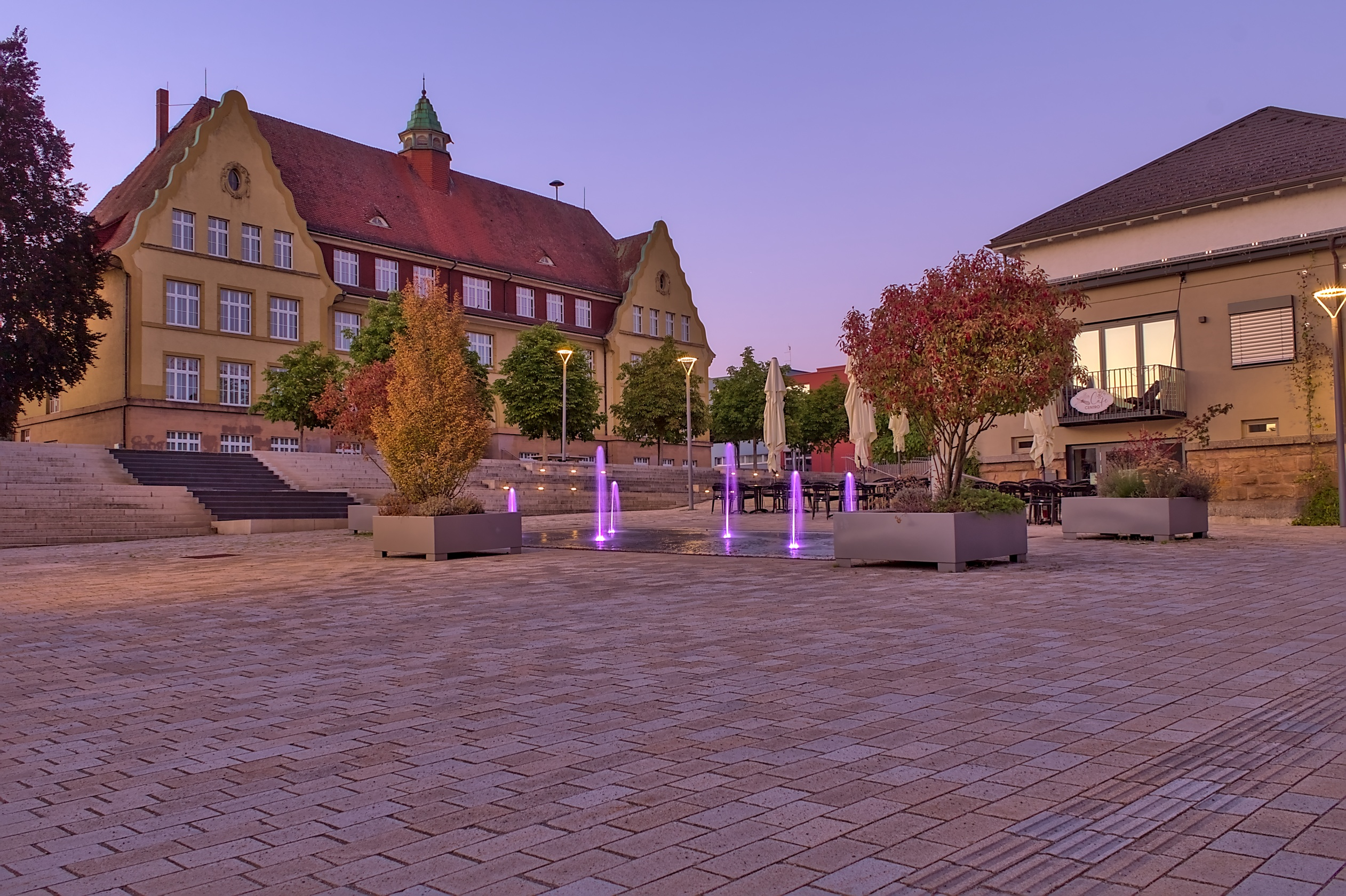
- Town Center of Murg „Murger Mitte“

- Coat of arms

- Location of Murg within Waldshut district
- Interactive map of Murg
- Location within Germany Location within Baden-Württemberg
- Coordinates: 47°33′N 8°1′E
- Country: Germany
- State: Baden-Württemberg
- Admin. region: Freiburg
- District: Waldshut

Government
  - Mayor (2023–31): Adrian Schmidle

Area
  - Total: 20.9 km^{2} (8.1 sq mi)
- Elevation: 300 m (980 ft)

Population (2025-12-31)
  - Total: 6,930
  - Density: 332/km^{2} (859/sq mi)
- Time zone: UTC+01:00 (CET)
  - Summer (DST): UTC+02:00 (CEST)
- Postal codes: 79730
- Dialling codes: 07763
- Vehicle registration: WT
- Website: www.murg.de

Murg (German pronunciation: [mʊʁk]) is a municipality in the district of Waldshut in Baden-Württemberg in southwestern Germany, on the right (north) bank of the High Rhine. The small river Murg flows into the Rhine in the municipality.

== Demographics ==
Population development:

Year	Inhabitants
1990	6,664
2001	6,887
2011	6,757
2021	6,907
