= High Rhine =

Part of the river Rhine in Switzerland and Germany

High Rhine (Hochrhein)
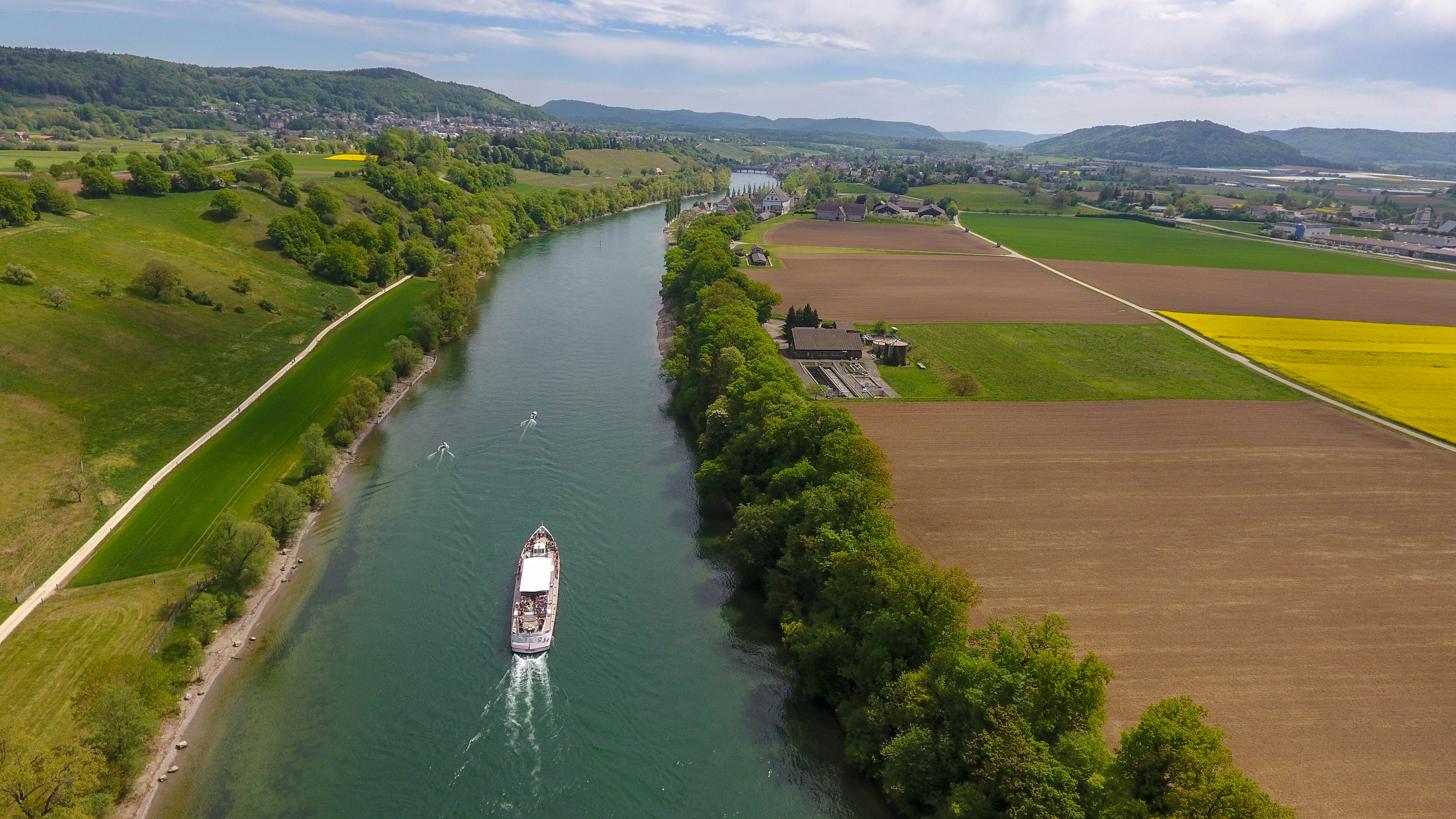
- Upper part of the High Rhine near Dörflingen

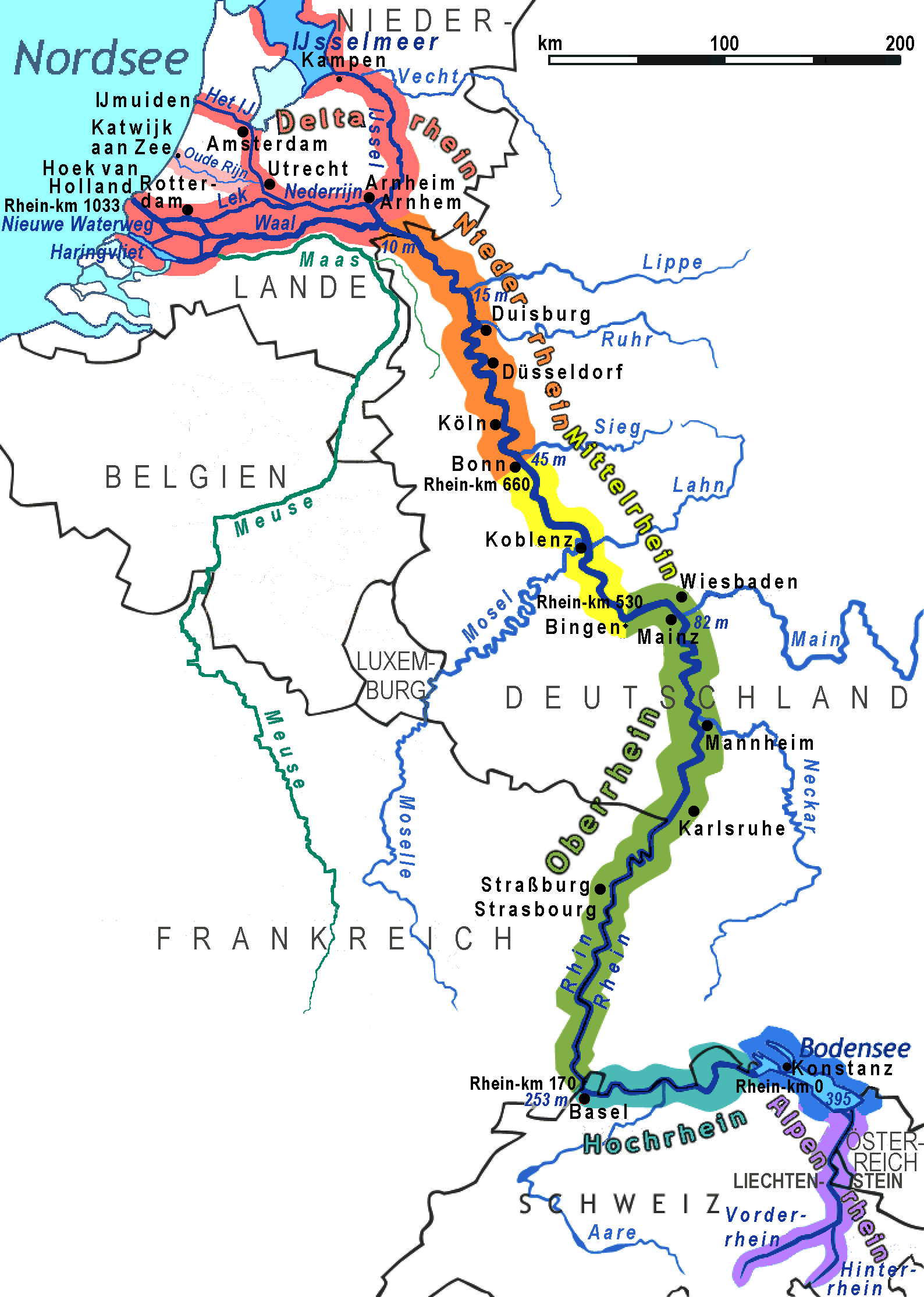
- Sections of the Rhine: Rhine–Meuse–Scheldt delta Lower Rhine Middle Rhine Upper Rhine High Rhine Lake Constance (Untersee, Seerhein, Obersee) Alpine Rhine, Vorderrhein, Hinterrhein Rhine sources

Location
- Country: Germany
- State: Baden-Württemberg
- Districts: Konstanz, Lörrach, Waldshut
- Country: Switzerland
- Cantons: Aargau, Basel-Landschaft, Basel-Stadt, Schaffhausen, Thurgau, Zürich

Physical characteristics
- Source
  - location: Lower Lake Constance (Untersee) in Stein am Rhein
  - coordinates: 47.664762°N 8.858715°E
  - elevation: 395 m
- Mouth
  - location: Basel, continues as the Upper Rhine (Oberrhein)
  - coordinates: 47.560148°N 7.589726°E
  - elevation: 252 m
- Length: 165 km (103 mi)
- Basin size: 24900 km^{2}

Basin features
- Tributaries
  - left: Aare, Birs, Ergolz, Glatt, Möhlinbach, Sissle, Thur, Töss
  - right: Alb, Biber, Durach, Murg, Wehra, Wutach

High Rhine (German: Hochrhein, pronounced [ˈhoːxˌʁaɪn]; kilometres (Note: The kilometrage of the Rhine begins at the Old Rhine Bridge in the city of Konstanz (Constance) and ends at the Hook of Holland at the North Sea.) 0 to 167 of the Rhine) is the section of the Rhine between Lake Constance (Bodensee) and the city of Basel, flowing in a general westerly direction and forming mostly the Germany–Switzerland border. It is the first of four named sections of the Rhine (High Rhine, Upper Rhine, Middle Rhine, Lower Rhine) between Lake Constance and the river delta at the North Sea.

== Name ==
The term High Rhine was introduced by scientists in the 19th century. Above all geologists tried to differentiate the High Rhine (German: Hochrhein) linguistically from the Upper Rhine (French: Rhin Supérieur, German: Oberrhein). Until the 19th century, it was also known as the 'Badisch-Swiss Rhine'. It lends its name to the High Rhine Railway line, which to a great extent follows the river to the north of it.

== Geography ==
=== Course ===
The High Rhine begins at the outflow of the Rhine from the Untersee (Lower Lake Constance) in Stein am Rhein and turns into the Upper Rhine at the Rhine knee (Rheinknie) in Basel (more precisely at the Middle Bridge). It is marked by Rhine-kilometers 0 to 167, with the measurements beginning at the outflow from the Obersee (Upper Lake Constance) at the Old Rhine Bridge in Konstanz (Constance), although the part between the Upper and Lower Lake Constance is distinguished as the Seerhein (English: Lake Rhine) and the part of Lower Lake Constance through which the Rhine flows is known as the Rheinsee. Therefore, the High Rhine begins at Rhine-kilometer 25.45.

In contrast to the Alpine Rhine (the main tributary of Lake Constance) and Upper Rhine, which both flow mainly in a south-to-north direction, the High Rhine flows mostly from east to west. Between Schaffhausen and the confluence with the Töss, it flows from north to south for about 20 km (12 mi), with a distinct meander at Rheinau. In its eastern portion, the river passes through the Molasse basin (passing south of the Hegau region), while in its western part it traverses the Table Jura before entering the Upper Rhine Plain at Basel, where it turns northwards.

In its western section, the High Rhine mostly marks the border between Germany and Switzerland except in the Swiss canton of Basel-Stadt. In the eastern part, there are several disconnected areas of Switzerland to the north of the river (canton of Schaffhausen and Rafzerfeld of the canton of Zurich). The German enclave of Büsingen am Hochrhein is located on the northern bank of the High Rhine, surrounded by Swiss territory.

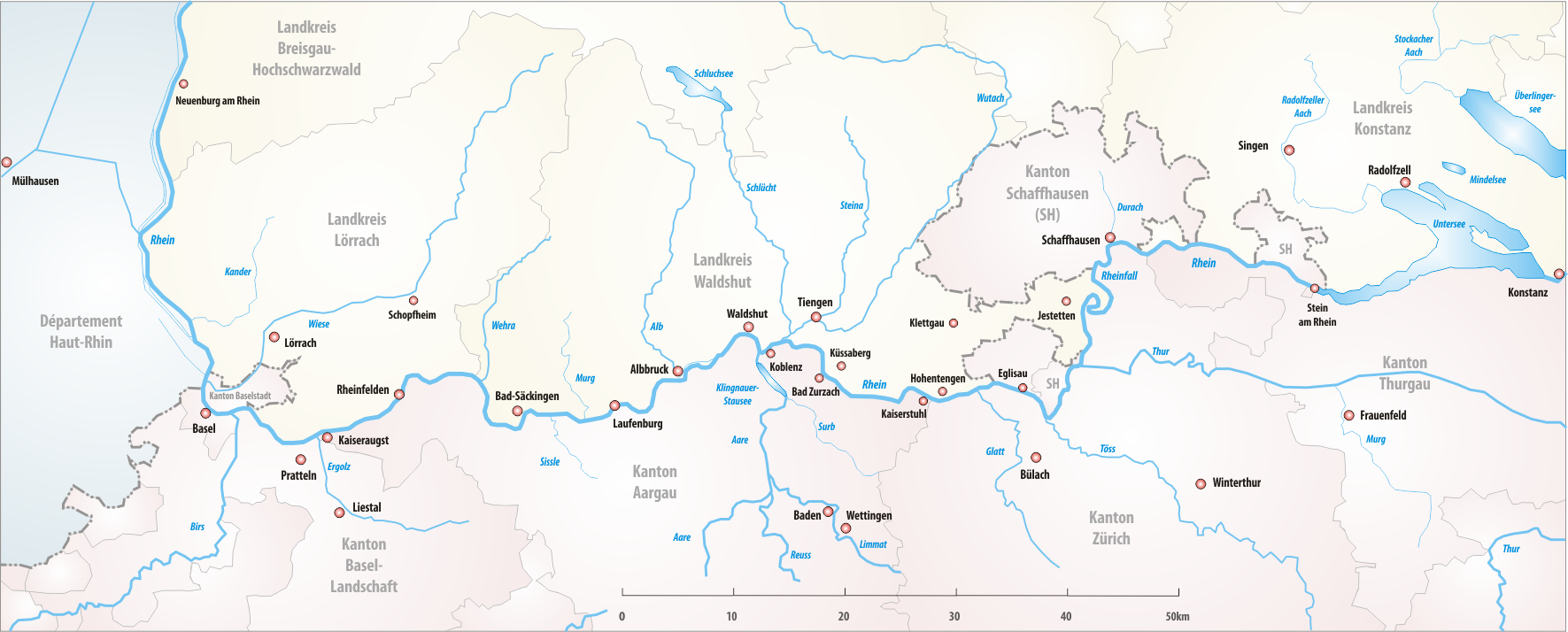
High Rhine between Stein am Rhein and Basel

=== Tributaries ===
Apart from many creeks, larger tributaries of the High Rhine are, in the order of their confluences, the Biber, Durach, Thur, Töss, Glatt, Wutach, Aare, Alb, Murg, Sissle, Wehra, Ergolz and Birs. The High Rhine's drainage basin measures 24,900 km^{2} (9,600 sq mi).

With 557 cubic metres per second (19,700 cu ft/s), the Aare has a larger discharge than the Rhine (439 cubic metres per second (15,500 cu ft/s)). From a hydrological point of view, therefore, the Rhine is a tributary of the Aare, not vice versa. The Rhine is, however, generally considered the main stream, because it is slightly longer than the Aare.

=== Waterfalls and rapids ===
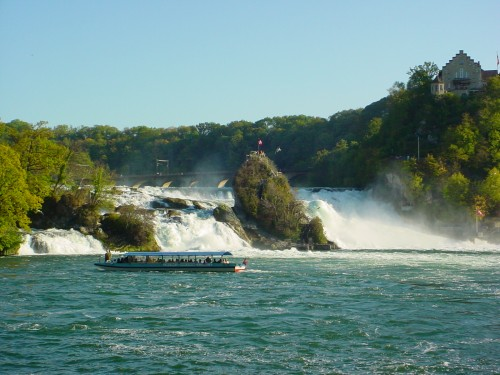
The Rhine Falls in Neuhausen

The Rhine Falls (Rheinfall), which are the largest plain waterfalls of Europe, are in the municipalities of Neuhausen am Rheinfall and Laufen-Uhwiesen, near the town of Schaffhausen. They are 150 metres (490 ft) wide and 23 metres (75 ft) high. In the winter months, the average water flow is 250 cubic metres per second (8,800 cu ft/s), while in the summer, the average water flow is 600 cubic metres per second (21,000 cu ft/s).

The rapids in the High Rhine should be viewed in the context of the relatively high slope—from 395 to 252 metres (1,296 to 827 ft) a.s.l. in just 165 kilometres (103 mi)—and the change of the river's course during the Würm ice age. In Neuhausen am Rheinfall, the river falls into a previously buried stream channel, forming the Rhine Falls at Schaffhausen. The next rapids are the Kadelburg Rapids at Koblenz. Near Laufenburg, the post-glacial Rhine failed to find the old silted-up channel and hit a spur of Black Forest crystal. The river cut itself a gorge, containing the Laufenburg Rapids. The Laufenburg and Schwörstadt Rapids have been artificially eliminated by blowing up the rocks and raising the water level with dams.

=== Interventions ===
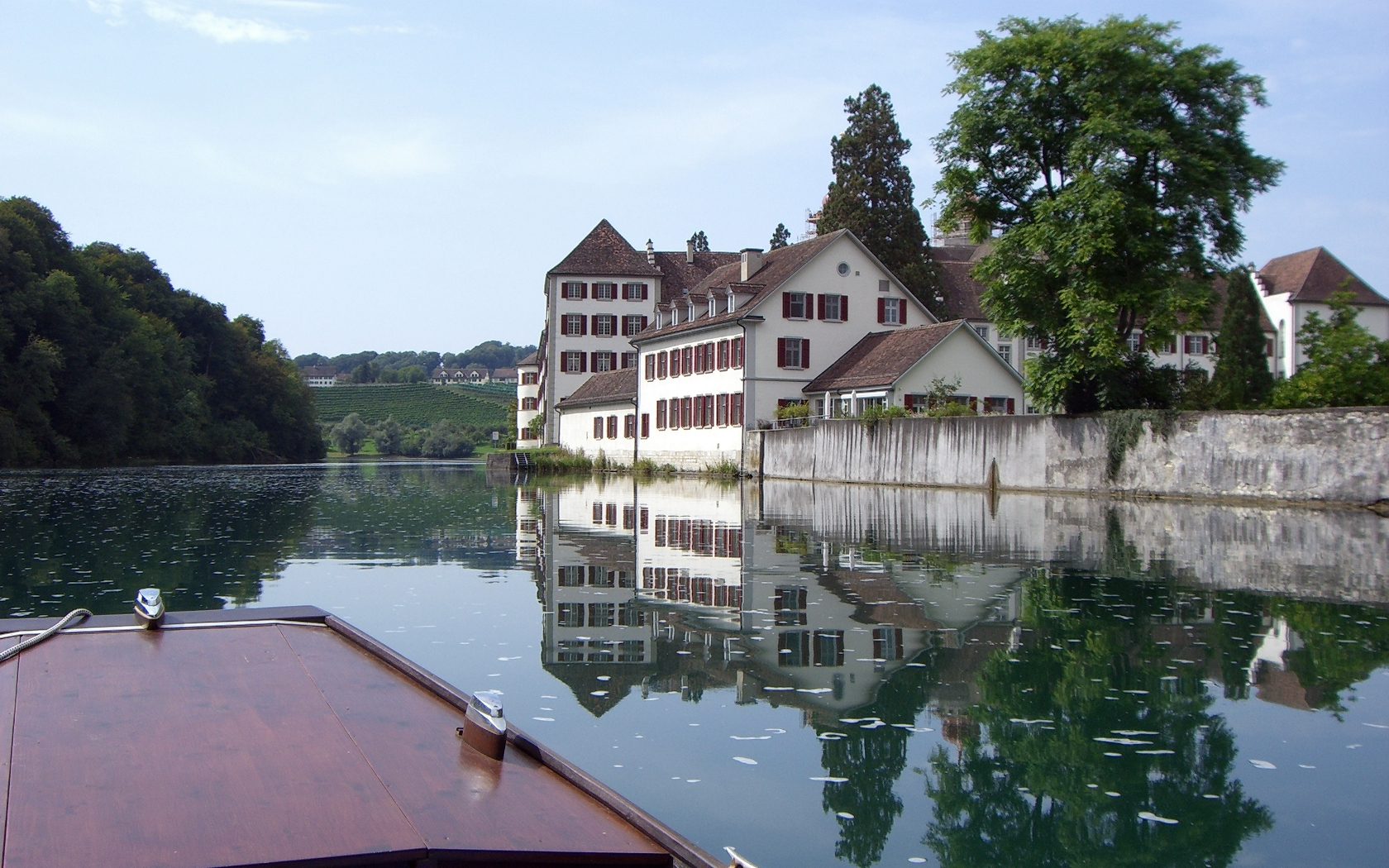
The High Rhine at Rheinau

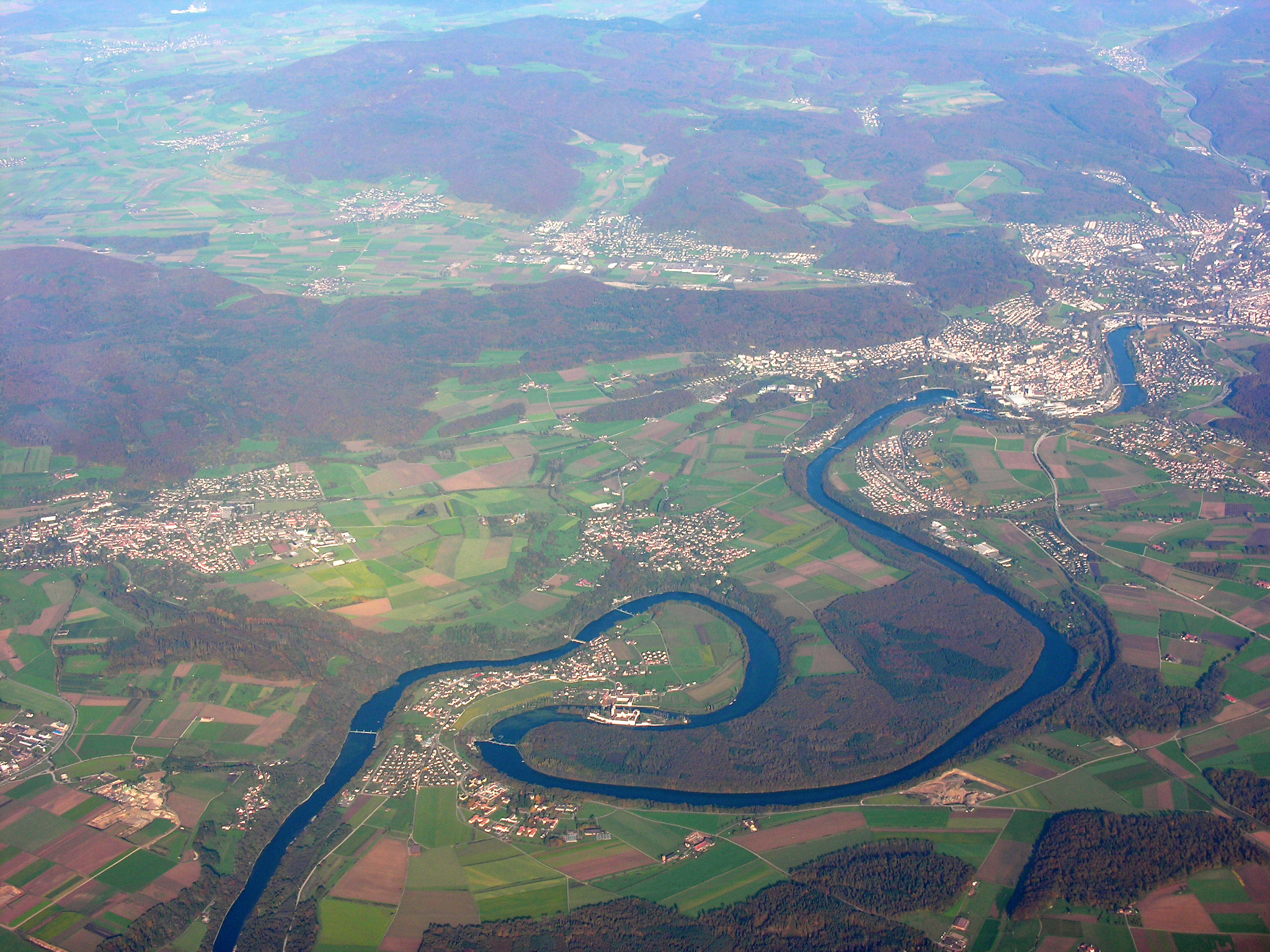
Meandering High Rhine near Rheinau

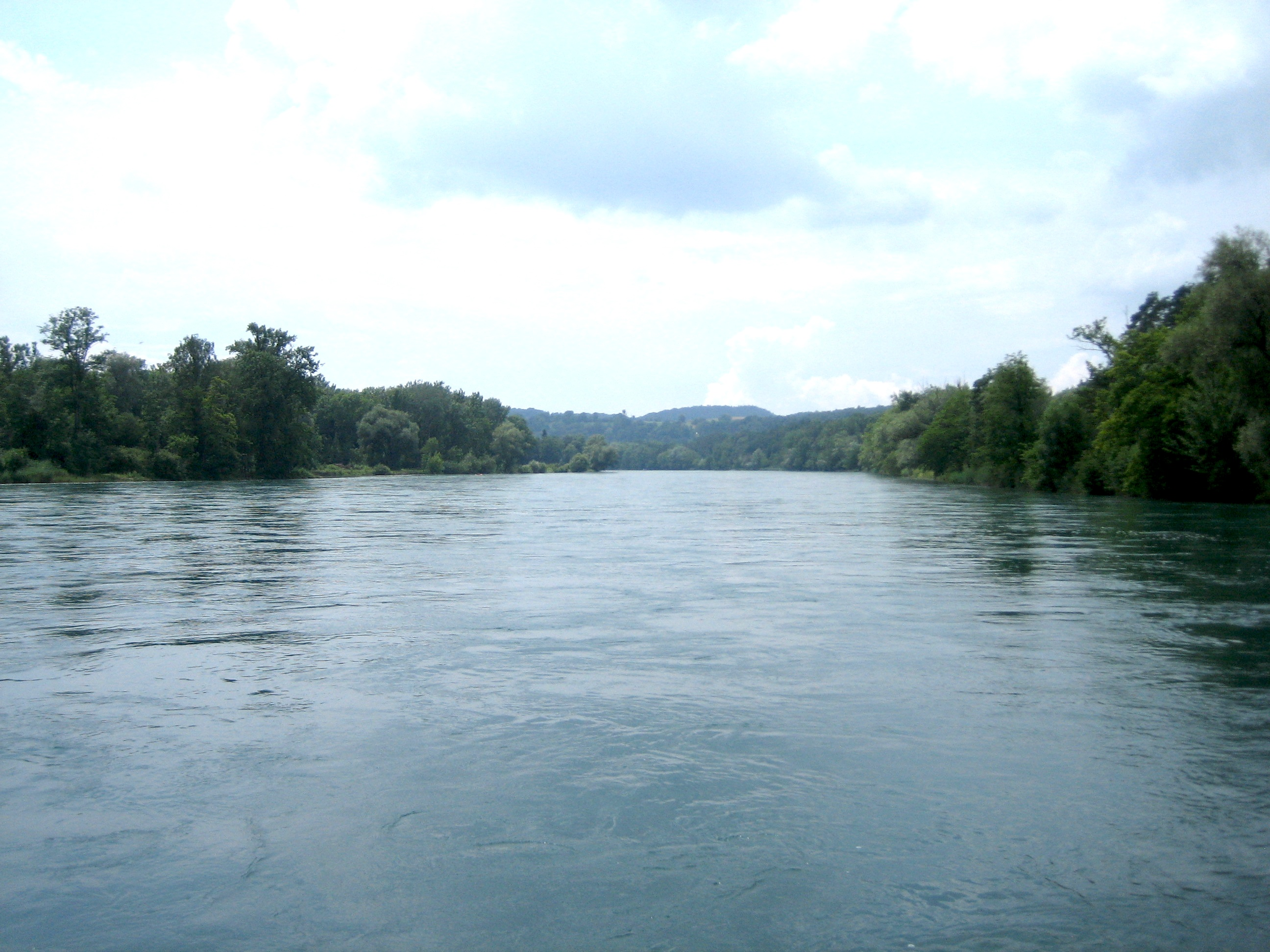
In Ellikon am Rhein

The character of the river has been changed over long distances by the construction of hydropower stations. The Laufenburg and Schwörstadt rapids were removed by blowing up rocks, originally to improve navigation, and later flooded due to the hydropower dams.

Between Stein am Rhein and Diessenhofen, the High Rhine is not dammed. The first power plant along the Rhine is located in Schaffhausen; it has a damming effect to slightly above Diessenhofen. The next power plant (Kraftwerk Reckingen) is located at Rekingen (Note: The town of Rekingen on the Swiss side of the river spells its name with -k-; the village on the German side spells its name with -ck-; since the power station is on the German side, it uses the -ck- spelling) and Küssaberg. After Rekingen, the High Rhine flows freely through the Koblenz Rapids to the confluence with the Aare. The next hydropower plant (the Kraftwerk Albbruck-Dogern), is at Leibstadt and Dogern. There are seven more power plants between here and Basel. Altogether, the High Rhine has eleven dams and twelve hydropower plants (there are two plants at the Augst/Wyhlen Dam.

=== Towns and organizations ===
Some parts of the High Rhine valley are fairly wide, while others are more gorge-like. The population density varies accordingly. Prominent towns on the High Rhine include Stein am Rhein, Schaffhausen, Neuhausen am Rheinfall, Waldshut, Laufenburg, Bad Säckingen, Rheinfelden and Basel. Some towns on the lower section of the river, which here corresponds to the Germany–Switzerland border, are located on both banks, such as Laufenburg (Aargau) and Laufenburg (Baden) and Rheinfelden (Aargau) and Rheinfelden (Baden).

The most important organizations for cross-border cooperation on the High Rhine are High Rhine Commission and High Rhine Agency.

Authorities on the Baden-Württemberg side of the river are organized in a framework called Regionalverband Hochrhein-Bodensee ("Regional cooperation High Rhine — Lake Constance").

=== Bridges ===
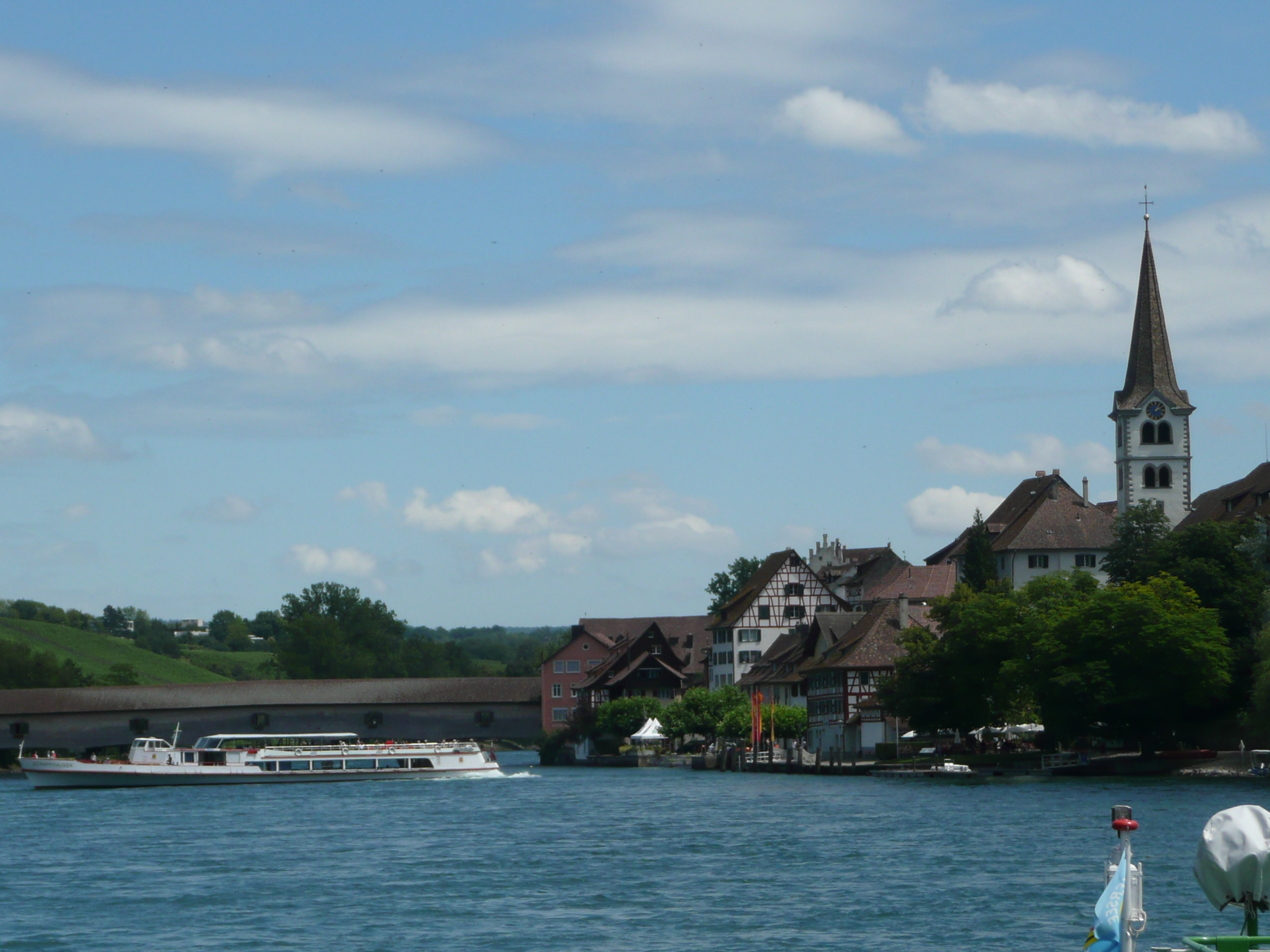
Ship of URh turning around in Diessenhofen

Several bridges cross the High Rhine, including a few historic ones. Examples are (in direction of waterflow): Eglisau railway bridge in Eglisau, Waldshut–Koblenz Rhine Bridge between Koblenz and Waldshut-Tiengen, the wooden bridge between Stein and Bad Säckingen or the Middle Bridge in Basel. The old wooden bridge between Gailingen and Diessenhofen is low so that during times when the water level of the river is high, large ships can no longer pass underneath it.

=== Important regions ===
Numerous areas along the High Rhine are currently, or were historically considered important. From west to east, they are Dinkelberg, Augstgau, Fricktal, Table Jura, Albgau, Aargau, Hotzenwald, Klettgau, Zurzibiet, Zürichgau, Hegau and Thurgau.

== Transportation ==
=== Shipping ===
There are passenger boat lines on the lower High Rhine (Rheinfelden–Basel), between Eglisau and Ellikon am Rhein (municipality of Marthalen) and on the upper High Rhine and Untersee (URh navigation company: Schaffhausen–Konstanz). There are also boat tours between Eglisau and the Rhine Falls (Rheinfall), including the Rhine Falls Rock, and between the Rhine Falls and Rekingen.

=== Railway ===
The High Rhine Railway line follows the lower section of the river (between Basel Bad Bf and Waldshut) along its northern banks, but then runs further north to it in its upper section (except in Schaffhausen).

On the Swiss side, the river is followed by (from west to east) the Bözberg railway line (between Pratteln and Stein-Säckingen) the Koblenz–Stein-Säckingen railway line (section between Laufenburg and Koblenz is closed to passenger trains), the Winterthur–Bülach–Koblenz railway line (between Koblenz and Eglisau), the Eglisau–Neuhausen railway line between Neuhausen Rheinfall and Neuhausen (briefly venturing through German territory crossing the Jestetter Point), the Rheinfall Railway line (between Dachsen and Schaffhausen), and the Lake Line between Schaffhausen and Stein am Rhein.

The High Rhine is crossed by (from west to east) the Basel Connecting Line (between Basel SBB and Basel Bad Bf), the Turgi–Koblenz–Waldshut railway line between Koblenz and Waldshut, the Eglisau–Neuhausen railway line (between Eglisau and Hüntwangen-Wil), the Rheinfall Railway line (between Schloss Laufen am Rheinfall and Neuhausen), the Lake Line between Feuerthalen and Schaffhausen, and the Etzwilen–Singen railway line (between Etzwilen and Hemishofen, used as a heritage railway only).

== See also ==
- High Rhine Railway
- Lake Constance
- List of rivers of Germany
- List of rivers of Switzerland
