= Brunnisach =

River in Germany

Location
- Country: Germany
- State: Baden-Württemberg

Physical characteristics
- Mouth
  - location: Lake Constance
  - coordinates: 47°40′06″N 9°24′33″E
- Length: 15.3 km (9.5 mi)

Basin features
- Progression: Rhine→ North Sea

The Brunnisach is a river in Baden-Württemberg, Germany. It flows into Lake Constance, which is drained by the Rhine, near Friedrichshafen.

Part of its course flows though the town of Markdorf.

== See also ==
- List of rivers of Baden-Württemberg
