= Lutter (Leine) =

River in Germany

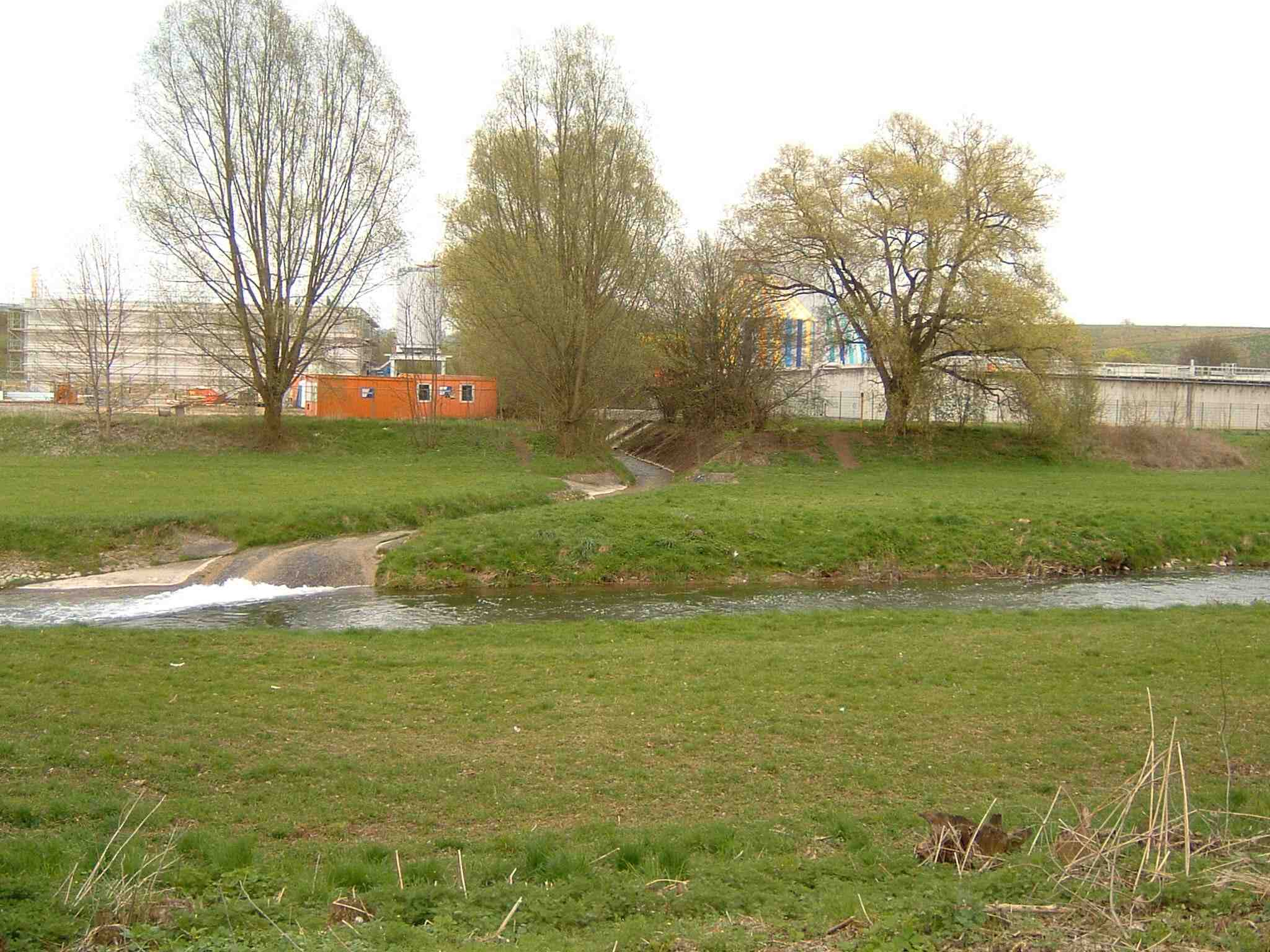
- Mouth of the Lutter into the Leine; behind the trees is the Göttingen sewage farm

Location
- Country: Germany
- State: Lower Saxony
- Location: In Göttingen

Physical characteristics
- Source
  - location: In the Göttingen Forest
- Mouth
  - location: Into the Leine
  - coordinates: 51°33′18″N 9°54′56″E
- Length: 7.8 km (4.8 mi)
- Basin size: 38 km^{2} (15 sq mi)

Basin features
- Progression: Leine→ Aller→ Weser→ North Sea
- Landmarks: Cities: Göttingen

Lutter (German pronunciation: [ˈlʊtɐ]) is a river in Göttingen, Lower Saxony, Germany. It is a tributary from the right (east) to the Leine.

The stream lies entirely within the city of Göttingen, rising in the southern Göttingen Forest and flowing into the Leine as a canalized ditch just west of the intersection of highways B27 and B3 in or near the borough of Weende.

== See also ==
- List of rivers of Lower Saxony
