= Lower Rhine =

Lower portion of the river Rhine

Lower Rhine (Niederrhein)
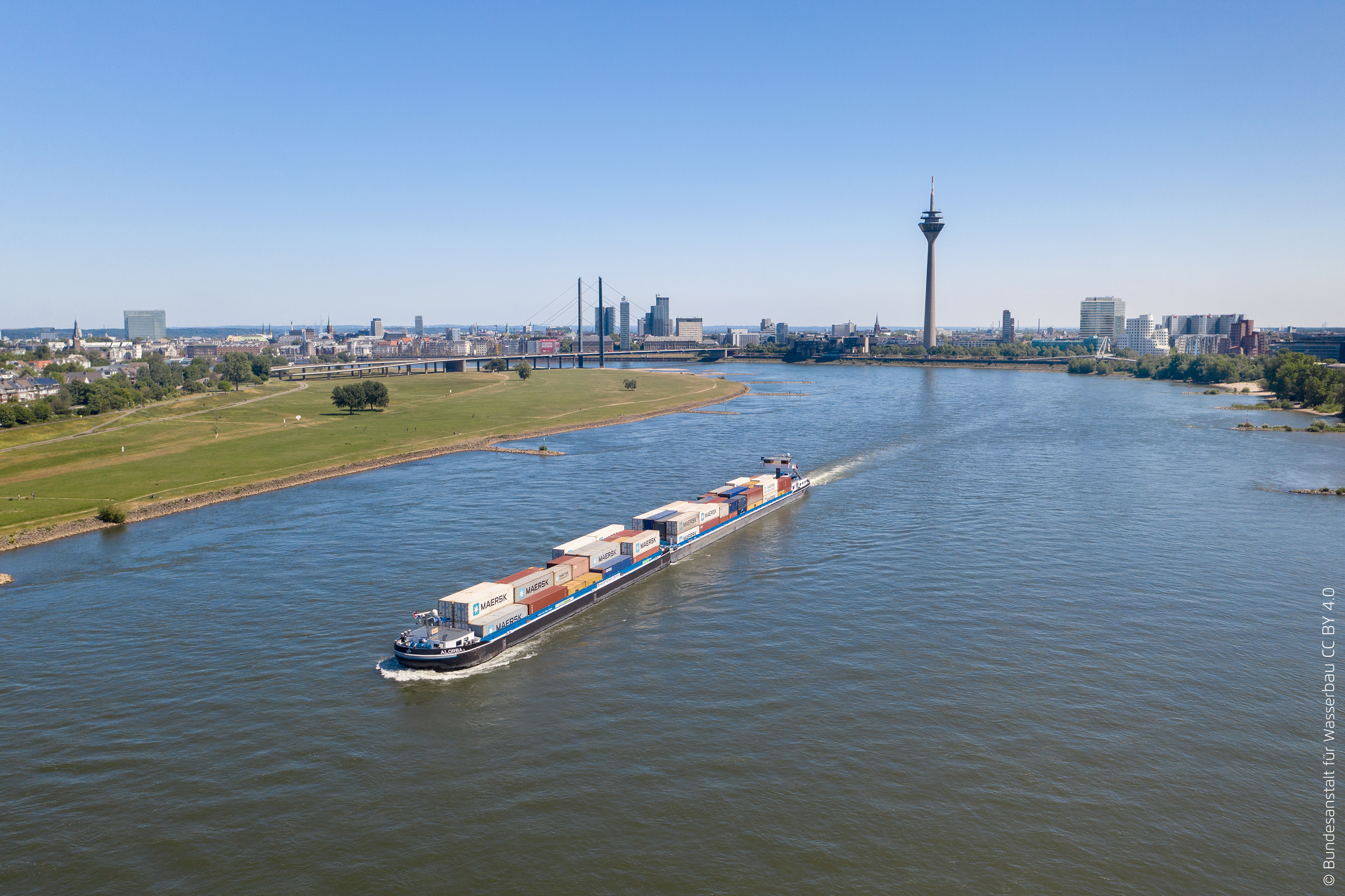
- Lower Rhine at Düsseldorf

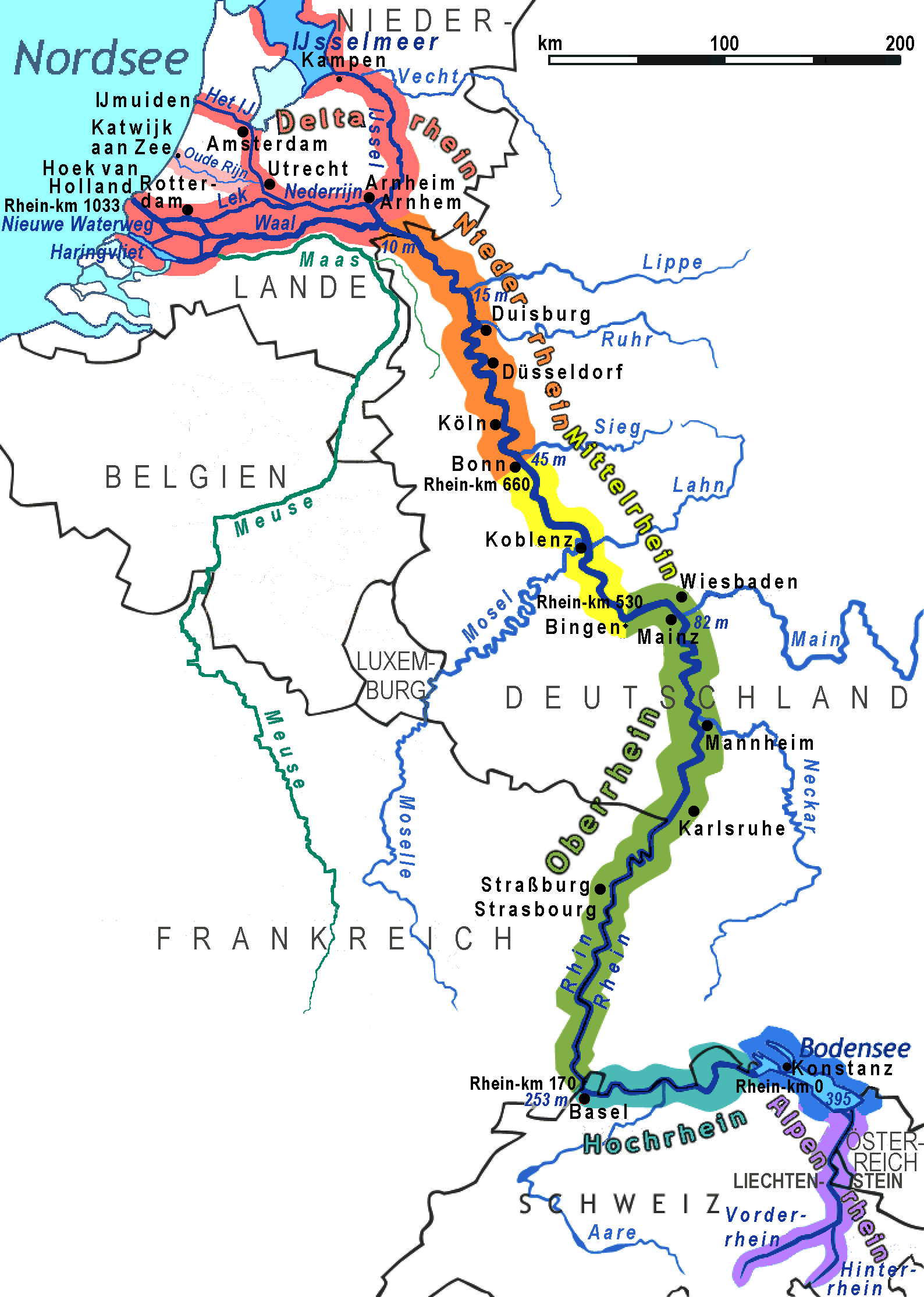
- Sections of the Rhine: Rhine–Meuse–Scheldt delta Lower Rhine Middle Rhine Upper Rhine High Rhine Lake Constance (Untersee, Seerhein, Obersee) Alpine Rhine, Vorderrhein, Hinterrhein Rhine sources

Location
- Country: Germany
- States: North Rhine-Westphalia
- Districts: Bonn, Cologne, Duisburg, Düsseldorf, Kleve, Krefeld, Leverkusen, Mettmann, Rhein-Erft, Rhein-Kreis Neuss, Rhein-Lahn, Rhein-Sieg, Wesel
- Country: The Netherlands
- Provinces: Gelderland, South Holland, Utrecht

Physical characteristics
- Source
  - location: Between Bad Godesberg and Bonn-Oberkassel, continuation of the Middle Rhine
  - coordinates: 50°42′20″N 7°9′46.2″E
  - elevation: 61 m
- Mouth
  - location: Hook of Holland, North Sea
  - coordinates: 51°58′53.3″N 4°4′50.99″E
  - elevation: 0 m
- Length: 373 km (232 mi), 205.5 km (127.7 mi) without the Nederrijn

Basin features
- Tributaries
  - left: Erft, Kalflack, Meuse
  - right: Düssel, Emscher, Lippe, Ruhr, Sieg, Wupper

Lower Rhine (German: Niederrhein, pronounced [ˈniːdɐˌʁaɪn]; kilometres (Note: The kilometrage of the Rhine begins at the Old Rhine Bridge in the city of Konstanz (Constance) and ends at the Hook of Holland at the North Sea.) 660 to 1,033 of the Rhine) is the section of the Rhine between Bonn in Germany and the North Sea at Hook of Holland in the Netherlands, including the Nederrijn (English: Nether Rhine) within the Rhine–Meuse–Scheldt delta; alternatively, Lower Rhine may also refer to just the part upstream of Pannerdens Kop (km 660–865.5), excluding the Nederrijn.

It is the last of the four sections of the Rhine between Lake Constance and the North Sea (the others being the High Rhine, Upper Rhine and Middle Rhine).

== Geography ==
=== German section ===
Downstream of Bonn, the river meanders through the Lower Rhine Bay (Niederrheinische Bucht), passing through the city of Cologne (Köln), and continues through the Lower Rhine Plain (Niederrheinisches Tiefland). The German term Niederrhein refers both to the German section of the Lower Rhine as well as to parts of the surrounding Lower Rhine region.

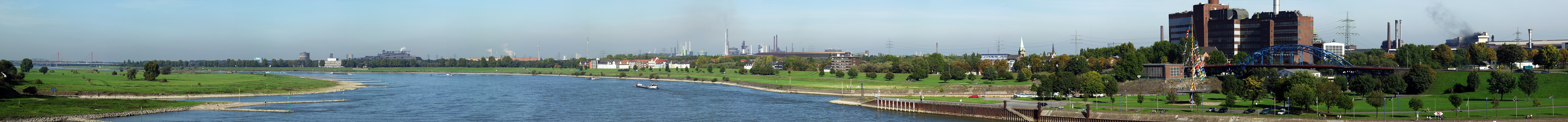
The Lower Rhine at Duisburg

=== Netherlands section ===
Almost immediately after entering the Netherlands, the Rhine splits into numerous branches. The main branch is called the Waal which flows from Nijmegen to meet the Meuse; after which it is called Merwede. Near Rotterdam the river is known as Nieuwe Maas, and becomes the Nieuwe Waterweg flowing into the North Sea at Hook of Holland.

The downstream Lower Rhine is a low-lying land. Up to the beginning of industrialization roughly one fifth of the land area could only be used as pasture: an endless meadow, which could not be farmed because of flooding and a high ground-water level. However, the remaining soils of the Lower Rhine were always very fertile. That can also be seen in the farmsteads. The houses are relatively large, with the intention of accommodating a plentiful harvest and many cattle. The Nederrijn refers to the more northern former main branch of the Rhine, which flows past Arnhem; splits off the IJssel which flows into the IJsselmeer and then splits into the Lek and the Kromme Rijn at Wijk bij Duurstede. The Lek flows into the Merwede. The Kromme Rijn continues past Utrecht, becomes the Leidse Rijn, then Oude Rijn and flows into the North Sea at Katwijk.

There are other minor branches such as the Vecht, Hollandse IJssel and the Noord.

== See also ==
- Rhineland
- Nederrijn
- Low Rhenish
- Lower Rhine, a French department bordering the Upper Rhine
- Lower Rhine, a Prussian province (1815 to 1822) bordering the Middle Rhine
- Other sections of the Rhine:
  - Middle Rhine
  - Upper Rhine
  - High Rhine
  - Alpine Rhine
- List of rivers of Germany
