= Königsbach (Rhine) =

River in Germany

- The Königsbach flowing into the Rhine

- Location of mouth

Location
- Country: Germany
- State: Rhineland-Palatinate

Physical characteristics
- Source
  - location: West of the hill Dommelberg at the edge of the Hunsrück
- Mouth
  - location: Opposite of Niederlahnstein into the Rhine
  - coordinates: 50.3232°N 7.5874°E

Basin features
- Progression: Rhine→ North Sea

Königsbach is a river of Rhineland-Palatinate, Germany. It springs west of the hill Dommelberg at the edge of the Hunsrück. It discharges into the Rhine from the left, opposite of Niederlahnstein.

== See also ==
- List of rivers of Rhineland-Palatinate
