= Schwarzbach (Klettgau) =

River in Switzerland and Germany

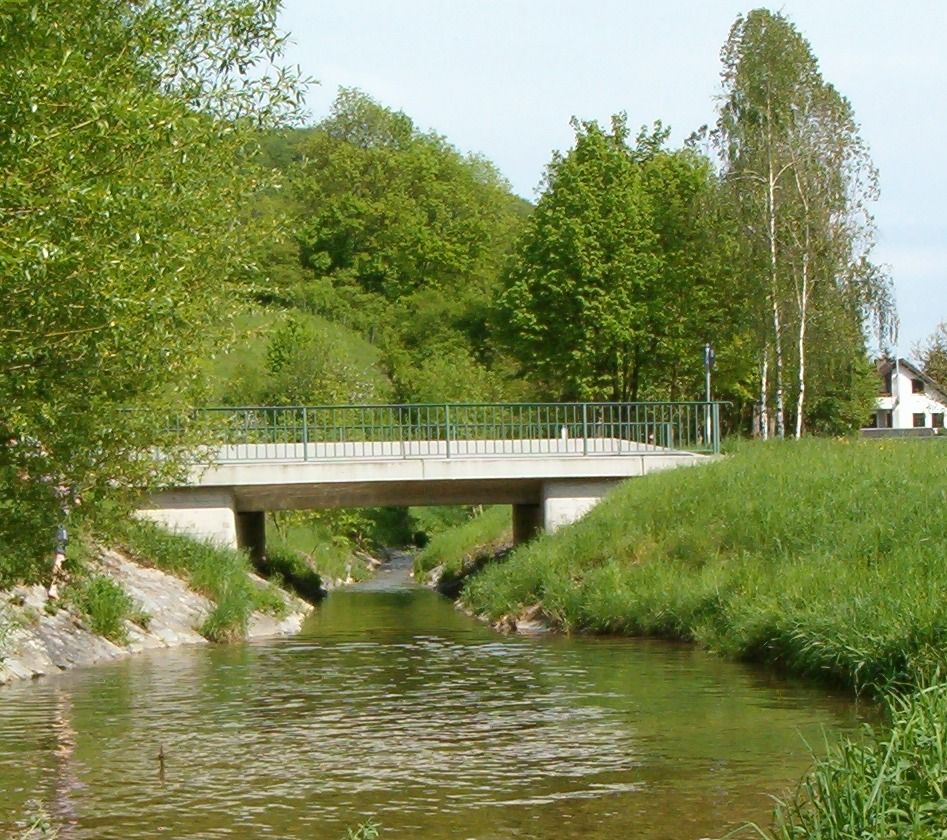
- The Schwarzbach at the edge of Riedern am Sand

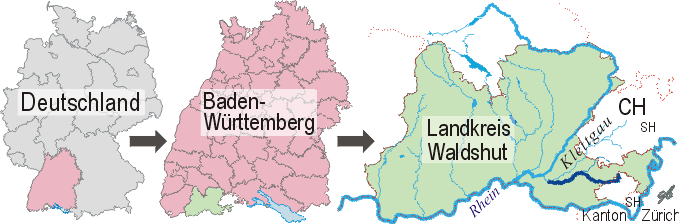

Location
- Countries: Switzerland and Germany
- Canton: Zürich
- State: Baden-Württemberg

Physical characteristics
- Source
  - location: East of Berwangen
  - coordinates: 47.63180°N 8.51833°E
  - elevation: ca. 541 m (1,775 ft)
- Mouth
  - location: Above Lauchringen into the Klingengraben
  - coordinates: 47.61273°N 8.34161°E
  - elevation: 369 m (1,211 ft)
- Length: 17.5 km (10.9 mi)
- Basin size: 64.056 km^{2} (24.732 sq mi)
- Discharge
  - average: 0.638 m^{3}/s (22.5 cu ft/s)
  - minimum: 0.248 m^{3}/s (8.8 cu ft/s)

Basin features
- Progression: Klingengraben→ Wutach→ Rhine→ North Sea
- Tributaries
  - right: Seegraben

Schwarzbach (German pronunciation: [ˈʃvaʁtsˌbax], lit. 'black stream') is a river of the Canton of Zürich, Switzerland, and of Baden-Württemberg, Germany. It is a left tributary of the Klingengraben.

== Geography ==
Schwarzbach has its origin in the southern range of hills that separates Klettgau from the Rhine. Its headwaters lie approximately two kilometers northwest of the municipality of Rafz in Switzerland and one kilometer east of the village Berwangen in Dettighofen, Germany. South of Dettighofen, the river forms a short section of the Germany–Switzerland border.

After about four kilometers the Schwarzbach runs entirely on German territory, passing the villages Bühl and Riedern am Sand, and leaving its valley near Riedern am Sand to flow across the plain of Klettgau. Shortly after it enters the plain, roughly halfway through its course, the creek Seegraben flows into it from the east. Like Schwarzbach, Seegraben also originates along Switzerland's northern border in the southern hills of Klettgau, near the Swiss village of Osterfingen and the valley Wangental.

On the plain in Klettgau, the Schwarzbach flows further west with a gentle slope. It flows through the village Grießen and passes Geißlingen further south. Near upper Lauchringen, it flows into the Klingengraben from the left with a flow of approximately 0.64 m^{3}/s (23 cu ft/s).

== Infrastructure ==
The main route along the plain of Klettgau is Bundesstraße 34, which accompanies the Kotbach and Schwarzbach in their lower reaches. From Geißlingen, Landesstraße 163 follows the course of the Schwarzbach and passes through its valley, to finally connect to Bundesstraße 27 in Jetstetten.

== Castles along the stream ==
The ruins of Burg Neu-Krenkingen, one of the castles of the nobile family of Krenkingen, lie above the stream.

== See also ==
- List of rivers of Baden-Württemberg
