= List of rivers of Berlin =

A list of rivers of Berlin, Germany:

== B ==
- Bäke

== D ==
- Dahme

== F ==
- Fredersdorfer Mühlenfließ

== H ==
- Havel

== K ==
- Kindelfließ

== P ==
- Panke

== S ==
- Spree

== T ==
- Tegeler Fließ
