= Rotach =

River in Germany

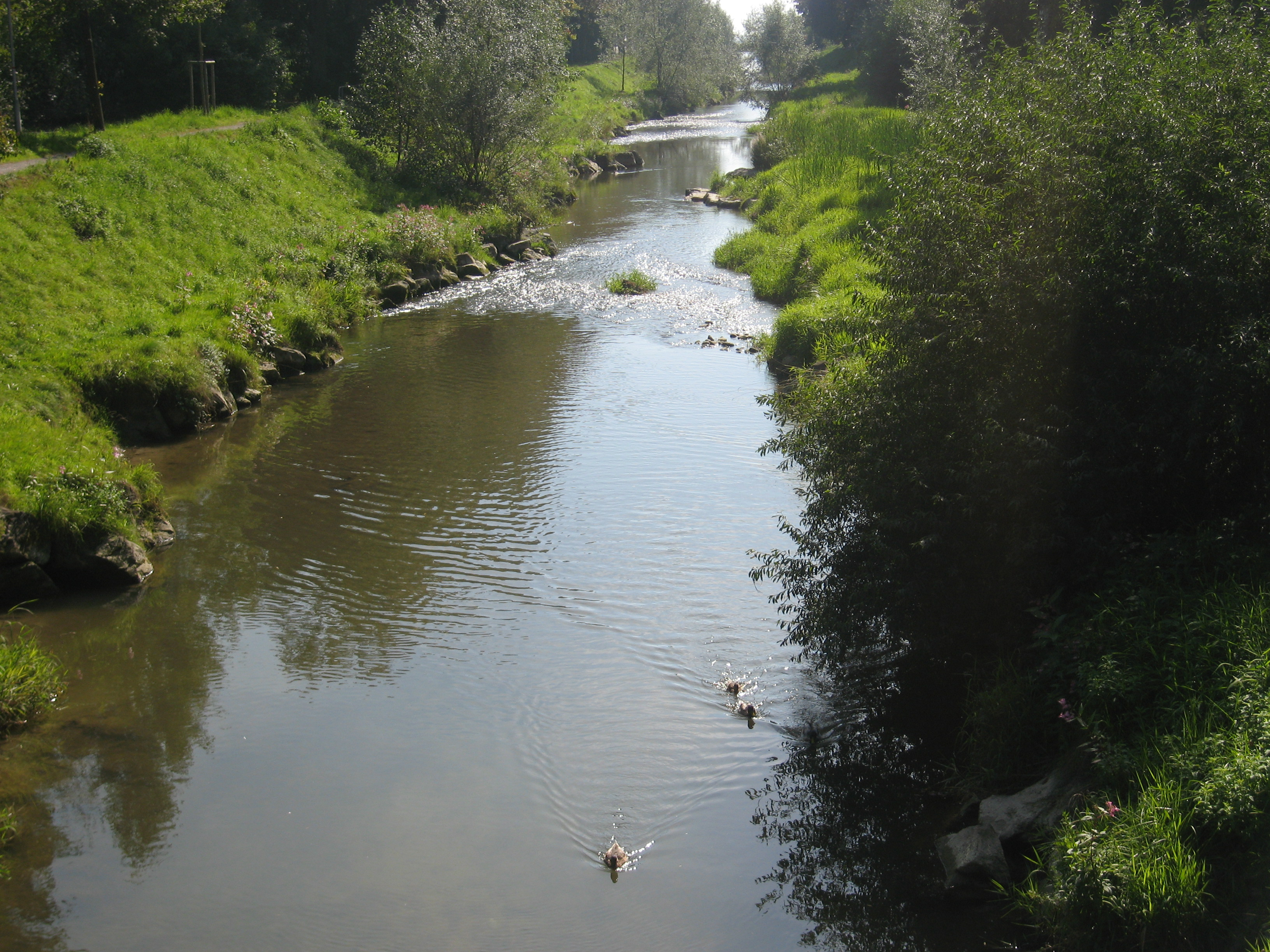
- The Rotach at Friedrichshafen

Location
- Country: Germany
- State: Baden-Württemberg

Physical characteristics
- Source
  - elevation: 620 m (2,030 ft)
- Mouth
  - location: Lake Constance
  - coordinates: 47°38′59″N 9°29′43″E
  - elevation: 395 m (1,296 ft)
- Length: 39.4 km (24.5 mi)
- Basin size: 136 km^{2} (53 sq mi)

Basin features
- Progression: Rhine→ North Sea

The Rotach is a 39-kilometre-long (24 mi) tributary of Lake Constance, which drains to the Rhine, in the German state of Baden-Württemberg. The river source is near the municipality of Wilhelmsdorf. It flows southward through Horgenzell and Oberteuringen before emptying into Lake Constance at the city of Friedrichshafen.
