= Seefelder Aach =

River in Germany

Seefelder Aach Salemer Aach, Linzer Aach
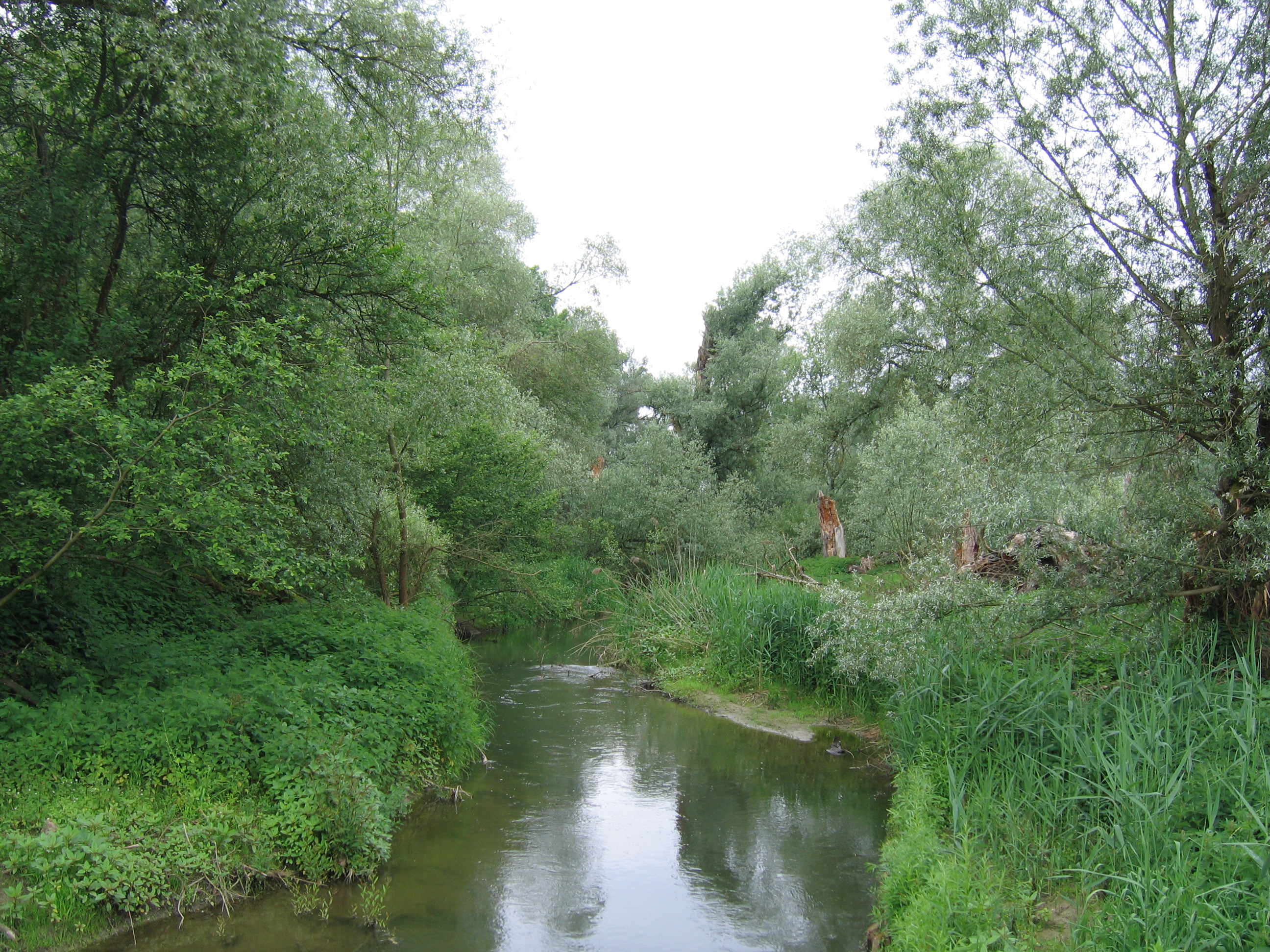

Location
- Country: Germany
- State: Baden-Württemberg
- Region: Tübingen

Physical characteristics
- Source
  - location: Between Alberweiler and Herdwangen in Herdwangen-Schönach
  - elevation: 670 m (2,200 ft)
- Mouth
  - location: Next to Seefelden in Uhldingen-Mühlhofen into Lake Constance
  - coordinates: 47.7331°N 9.2264°E
  - elevation: 395 m (1,296 ft)
- Length: 54.7 km (34.0 mi)
- Basin size: 279 km^{2} (108 sq mi)

Basin features
- Progression: Rhine→ North Sea
- Tributaries
  - left: Furtbach, Erlengraben, Aubach, Deggenhauser Aach, Gießbach
  - right: Herdenbach, Wäschbach, Torpenbach, Nellenflurb

The Seefelder Aach is a river in the districts of Sigmaringen and Bodenseekreis, Tübingen region, southern Baden-Württemberg, Germany. It is approximately 55 kilometres long and flows into Lake Constance. It has a catchment area of 279 km^{2} and is part of the Rhine river system. It starts as Salemer Aach and becomes the Seefelder Aach after the conjunction with the Deggenhauser Aach, further down from Salem. The upper part – near Aach-Linz – it is also colloquially called Linzer Aach or Hintere Aach.
