= Stockacher Aach =

River in Germany

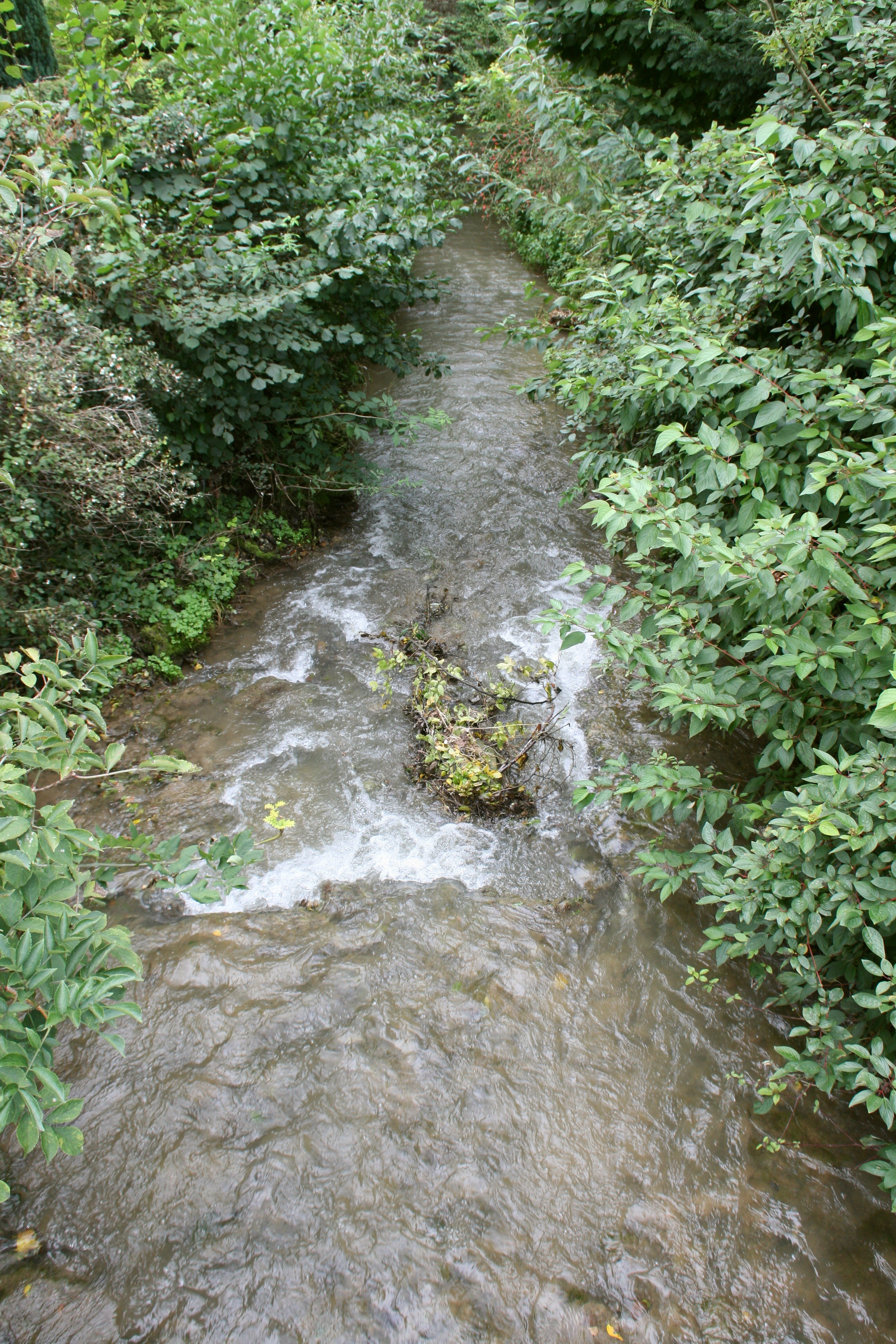

Location
- Country: Germany
- State: Baden-Württemberg

Physical characteristics
- Mouth
  - location: Lake Constance
  - coordinates: 47.8086°N 9.0338°E
- Length: 38.3 km (23.8 mi)
- Basin size: 243 km^{2} (94 sq mi)

Basin features
- Progression: Rhine→ North Sea

Stockacher Aach is a river of Baden-Württemberg, Germany. It is a tributary to Lake Constance, which is drained by the Rhine. It passes through Stockach and flows into Lake Constance near Bodman-Ludwigshafen.

== See also ==
- List of rivers of Baden-Württemberg
