= Ramsen =

Ramsen may refer to:

- Ramsen, Rhineland-Palatinate, a village in Donnersbergkreis, Rhineland-Palatinate, Germany
- Ramsen, Schaffhausen, village in the canton of Schaffhausen, Switzerland
  - Ramsen railway station, a railway station in Ramsen, Switzerland
- Ramsen (card game), a traditional Bavarian card game

== See also ==
- Remsen (disambiguation)
- Rumsen (disambiguation)
