= Giorgio Behr =

Swiss economist

- Born: September 18, 1948 (age 77); Schaffhausen, Switzerland
- Education: University of Zurich (Ph.D., 1974); University of Washington (1979)
- Occupation: Founder of Behr Bircher Cellpack
- Spouse: married
- Children: 4

Giorgio Behr (born 18 September 1948 in Schaffhausen, Switzerland) is a Swiss businessman, lawyer, accountant and university professor.

Behr is the founder and former chairman of the Behr Bircher Cellpack BBC as well as president of the Swiss handball club Kadetten Schaffhausen. Until the end of 2015, he was also CEO of the Behr Bircher Cellpack BBC, a position which he held for more than 12 years. Between 1990 and 2005 he was also Professor of Business Administration at the University of St. Gallen. Since resigning there in 2005, he has been honorary professor and president of the Institute for Accounting, Controlling and Auditing (ACA). In addition, he served as chairman of the Board of Directors of Saurer AG, first as vice president from 1995, then as president from 2003 to 2006. From 2008 to 2017, he was chairman of the Supervisory Board of ZF Friedrichshafen, one of the largest automotive suppliers worldwide. In 2017, following differences with the Zeppelin Foundation and the Lord Mayor of Friedrichshafen, Behr resigned from his position of Chairman of the Supervisory Board.

== Life ==
Behr studied law at the University of Zurich, where he graduated in 1971 and received his doctorate in 1974. This was followed in 1976 by the lawyer patent, 1979 by a diploma as a Chartered Accountant and a research stay at the University of Washington in Seattle.

Behr began his professional career in 1971 as a commercial school teacher in Zurich and Schaffhausen, starting in 1972, he worked at the auditing firm Fides (now part of KPMG), for which he worked from home and abroad until 1982 and specialized in renovating and restructuring companies. From 1982 to 1984, he worked for the industrial group Hesta (Zellweger-Luwa and Schiesser). In 1984, he founded his own consulting firm, BDS Consulting, and became self-employed. Parallel to his professional career, Behr began his academic career in 1989 and initially became a lecturer at the University of St. Gallen and from 1990, a professor of business administration with a main focus on accounting.

In 1991, his career took a turn from a reorganizer to becoming a real entrepreneur. At that time, Behr was commissioned to renovate the Bercher-based apparatus builder Bircher. When no buyer could be found for Bircher, Behr took over the enterprise threatened by bankruptcy, together with Anton Bucher Bechtler and the management. In 1993, Giorgio Behr belonged to the founding team of Bank am Bellevue.

After Behr took over a majority stake in the 1935 founded and based in Villmergen Cellpack Group in 2001, he then incorporated the Bircher Group together with the Cellpack Group in the newly formed group Behr Bircher Cellpack BBC in 2003. In addition, he served as a director and then as chairman of the board of directors of the Saurer Group (1994 to 2006). Since 1992, he has been a member of the board of the Liechtenstein Hilti Group and since 2008, chairman of the supervisory board of the German automotive supplier ZF Friedrichshafen.

Giorgio Behr represented Switzerland in the accounting bodies of the UN (ISAR) and the OECD (CIME where he was elected vice president and was spokesman of the OECD representative in the ISAR / UN), in the WP1 of the IOSCO and the Swiss Exchange in the EFRAG. He was, from the founding (in 1984) of the Standard Setter, for accounting in Switzerland, Swiss GAAP FER, Committee of the Commission and also president of the Commission of the FER (1992-2005). Since 2005, he has been president of the Board of FER. He was also President of the Financial Reporting Working Group of SWX Swiss Exchange (2002-2005). On behalf of the Federal Council, he was a member of the Commission Mengiardi 1998 for the revision of accounting and auditing law. In 2007, he was president of a small group of experts, where he was commissioned to draw up the draft of the new revision law (in force since 2007). Subsequently, he was (with the collaboration of Max Sterchi) an expert of the Federal Council for the drafting of the new Swiss accounting law (in force since 1 January 2013). From 1998 to 2001 he was a member of the board of trustees of the professional association of accountants and tax experts in Switzerland. From 2001 to 2003, he was a member of the executive committee of the Trustee Chamber and, from 2003 to 2007, first vice president and then president, of the Trustee Chamber (then limited to 2-year term).

In 2008, Giorgio Behr attracted attention, in particular through takeover attempts by listed companies, and in the process received fierce rejection responses from the respective companies. While he succeeded in the acquisition of Groupe Baumgartner Holding, he failed in his takeover attempts of Sia Abrasives. The shareholders and the management of Sia Abrasives, fought the planned commitment of the Swiss entrepreneur Giorgio Behr and preferred instead, a takeover by the German, Robert Bosch GmbH. In November 2015, it was announced that the new owner planned a larger job cut for the Swiss site of Sia Abrasives. This was against the commitments made in 2008, according to which the Switzerland location should not be relocated. Such a measure was pointed out by Giorgio Behr in the takeover battle for the company as a risk of a foreign solution. Contrary to this, the preservation of the location in Switzerland has always been formulated as a key strategic goal for Swiss entrepreneur Giorgio Behr, as Behr, with its Swiss-based Behr Bircher Cellpack BBC Group, has more synergy potential in Switzerland than the new owner in this case. In November 2008, Behr acquired, via its BDS investment company AG, a stake of 6.36 percent in the Swiss industrial group Georg Fischer, making it the largest single shareholder of the company.

In November 2009, the Swiss Financial Market Supervisory Authority (FINMA), announced that it had opened an administrative case against Giorgio Behr and others on suspicion of possible violations of reporting obligations in connection with a substantial shareholding in Sia Abrasives. On 16 March 2011, the Financial Market Authority filed a criminal complaint against Behr with the Federal Department of Finance (FDF) for breach of disclosure requirements. On 24 May 2011, the legal service of the FDF ceased proceedings after Behr made a reparation payment of one million francs. According to the business magazine Bilanz, the outcome of the procedure makes it clear that no deliberate violation could be proven and that it was at most a matter of negligence.

When, in 2005, the free newspaper Schaffhauser Bock got into financial difficulties and the jobs were endangered, Giorgio Behr took over the publishing rights and enabled the entrepreneur René Steiner an orderly execution of its activities as well as the rescue of the jobs. Today, the Schaffhauser Bock, in which the publisher Meier + Cie AG (publisher of the only daily newspaper in the region, the Schaffhauser Nachrichten) holds a minority stake, is again successful and was able to increase the number of readers from 38,000 (WEMF) to around 53,000.

Giorgio Behr is married and father of four sons, some of which are already successful in businesses. Pascal Behr with his partner Michael Gabi and the company Cytosurge; which in 2012, received the ZKB Pioneer Award Technopark from the Technopark Zürich and the Zürcher Kantonalbank for a technical project. His assets were estimated in 2012 by the Swiss business magazine Balance to 450 million Swiss francs.

== Other ==
Giorgio Behr is co-founder President of the charitable foundation Museumsbahn SEHR & RS, a heritage railway between Stein am Rhein / Etzwilen and Singen (Hohentwiel) (the Etzwilen–Singen railway line). With his noteworthy contribution, he has made the repair of, amongst others, the Ramsen station, the section in the area of Singen possible and the purchase of various vehicles. The SEHR & RS operates the SBB's only steam railway line, which runs from Stein am Rhein via the Rhein Hemishofen bridge over the Rhine and the state border to Singen. On 28 May 2011, for the first time since 1969 a passenger train across the border to Germany ran there. Thousands (in total there were about 10.000 visitors on the opening day) welcomed the first passenger train since 1969 - as in the founding of 1875.

As co-founder and main sponsor of the non-profit foundation National Handball Training & Performance Center NHTLZ Schweizersbild, Behr is also involved in indoor sports promotion in the greater Schaffhausen region. On 9 September 2011 the largest handball training center in Switzerland opened, in the BBC-Arena, a well-respected Europe-wide complex with four training halls and three game halls, a campus and an affiliated hotel operation. The Suisse Handball Academy SHA, set up by Giorgio Behr and led by Michael Suter, also enables young talent to combine sport and training. Behr is president of the Foundation Council of the non-profit foundation NHTLZ.

Giorgio Behr was himself with Gelbschwarz Schaffhausen at the beginning of the 1970s, under coach Eugen Wüger, player in the NLA (National League A) and NLB (today together Swiss Handball League SHL). After returning to his home club Kadetten Schaffhausen, he led the team as player-coach and trainer to the NLB (National League B) and founded a successful youth department (under President and Kadetten honorary member Kurt Baader). After a professional and family-related break, he took over the handball department as president in 1992, with a small team of former players, teammates and other Kadetten officials. Since then, the Kadetten have been playing at the top of the NLA in Swiss handball. In 1993, for the first time, they achieved qualification for participation in the European Cup in 1999, with the winning of the Cup victory it became the first national title they won. The Kadetten won the Masters championship title for the first time in 2005, to which five more followed until 2012. Today, the Kadetten are record title holders in both the Supercup and the Swiss Cup and one of the most successful clubs in terms of master championship titles. Behr was also for about 15 years the president of the Legal Authority for interregional leagues (ZDK SHV) and initiator and co-founder of the Suisse Handball League SHL, the merger of the NLA and NLB teams in men's handball. For four years, he was president of the SHL and a member of SHV's executive board.

Today, Behr is also president of the jury and of the board of trustees for the Dr. Kausch Prize at the University of St. Gallen. Giorgio Behr is also a member of the board of trustees and the program commission of Avenir Suisse. From 2006 until 2023, Giorgio Behr was president of the IVS Chamber of Commerce of the Schaffhausen region; during this time, the activities of the IVS were expanded.

== Awards ==
- "25 Jahre Unternehmertum – Festschrift für Giorgio Behr" (25 Years of Entrepreneurship) University of St. Gallen (2010), ISBN 3039091263.
- University of St. Gallen - Dr. Kausch-Preis (Dr. Kausch-Award), lifetime achievement award for accounting, auditing and controlling (2006)
- Tribute for lifetime achievement in handball and the construction of the BBC Arena together with the SHA campus 2013, awarded by "Schaffhauser Regionalsport" and "Sportler Gala"
- Swiss Handball Award (2012) – Special Award for Service of Excellence in handball
