= Biber (Rhine) =

River in the Swiss-German borderland

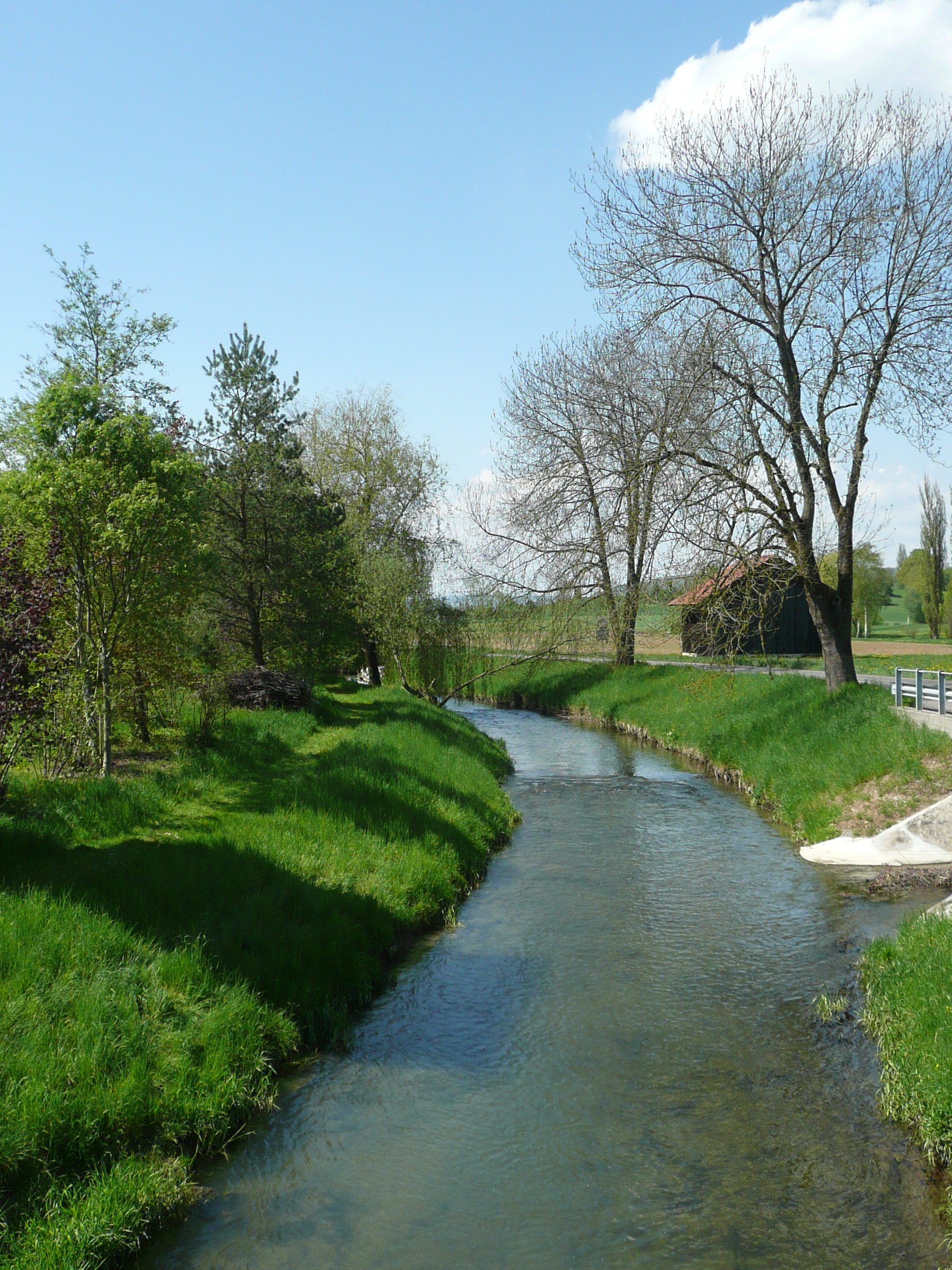
- Biber at Ramsen

Location
- Countries: Germany and Switzerland
- State: Baden-Württemberg
- Canton: Schaffhausen

Physical characteristics
- Source
  - location: Watterdingen (Tengen)
- Mouth
  - location: Bibermühle (Ramsen)
  - coordinates: 47°40′45″N 8°48′22″E
  - elevation: 394 m (1,293 ft)
- Length: 30.7 km (19.1 mi)
- Basin size: 168 km^{2} (65 sq mi)

Basin features
- Progression: Rhine→ North Sea
- Tributaries
  - left: Riedgraben, Dorfbach
- Municipalities: Thayngen

The Biber (German pronunciation: [ˈbiːbɐ]) is a small river in the borderland between Germany and Switzerland. The source is located at Watterdingen in the municipality Tengen, district of Constance in Baden-Wuerttemberg. After about 31 kilometres (19 mi) the Biber river flows into the Rhine at the Bibermühle (Biber Mill) west of Hemishofen in the Canton of Schaffhausen. The Biber is the largest tributary of the High Rhine on the stretch between Stein am Rhein and Schaffhausen.

== Course ==
On its way to the Rhine, the Biber crosses the Germany–Switzerland border three times. The source of the Biber is near Watterdingen in the municipality Tengen, in the Hegau, Germany. Then the Biber flows through the town of Blumenfeld, where she falls over the Blumenfeld waterfall. After Beuren, the Riedgraben flows in from the left. In Büßlingen, the Körbelbach flows in from the right. After that, it crosses the border into Switzerland, where it flows through the former municipalities of Hofen and Bibern, forming a short stretch of the Swiss-German border before flowing through Thayngen, the seat of the former Reiat district. Shortly after Thayngen, the Biber leaves Switzerland and flows through Bietingen and Randegg, where the Dorfbach joins, coming from Gottmadingen. Then it crosses the border again and the last kilometers flow through the upper part of the canton of Schaffhausen, through the municipalities of Buch and Ramsen. It flows into the Rhine at Biber Mill, west of Hemishofen.

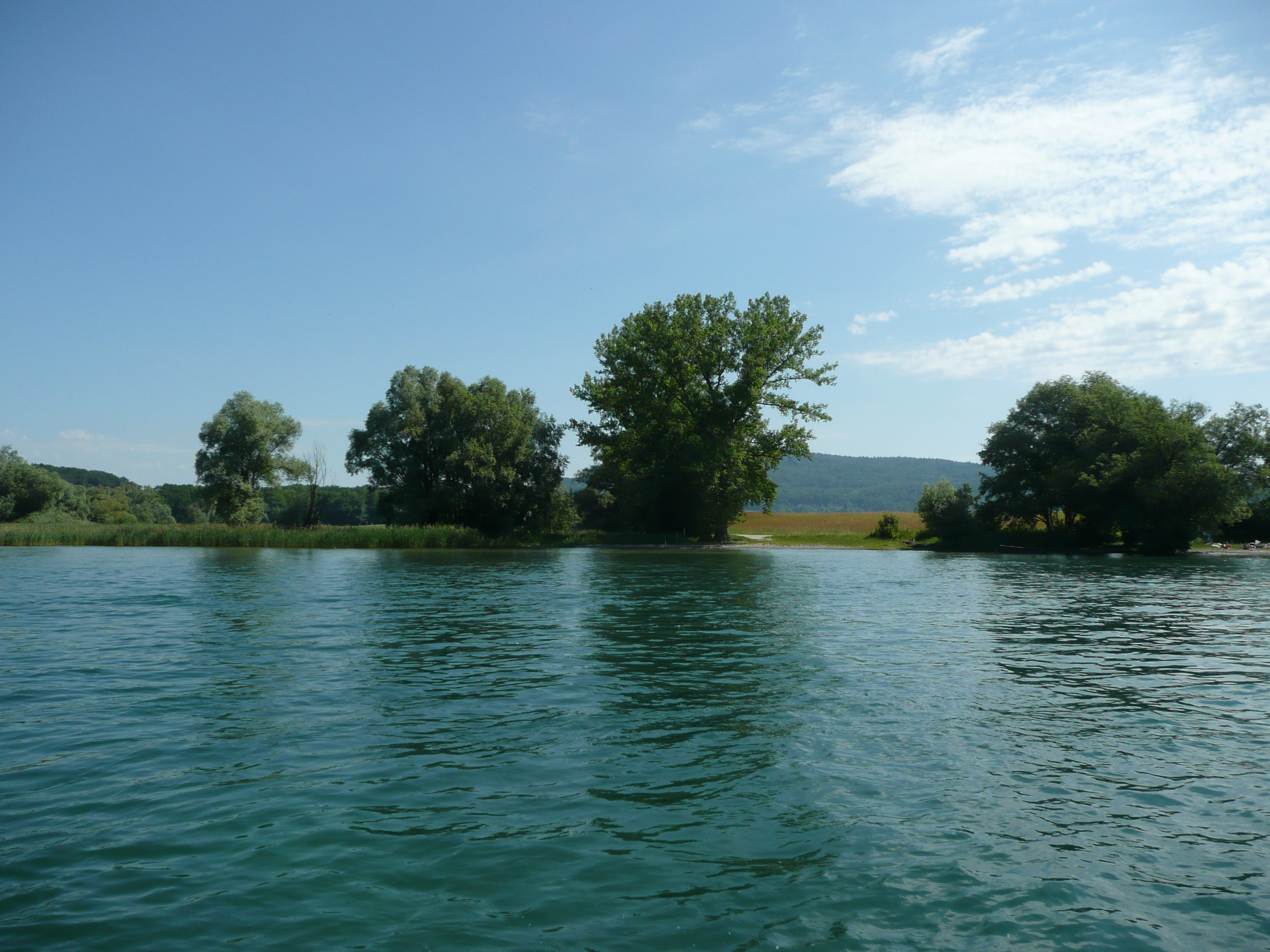
The Biber flows into the Rhine

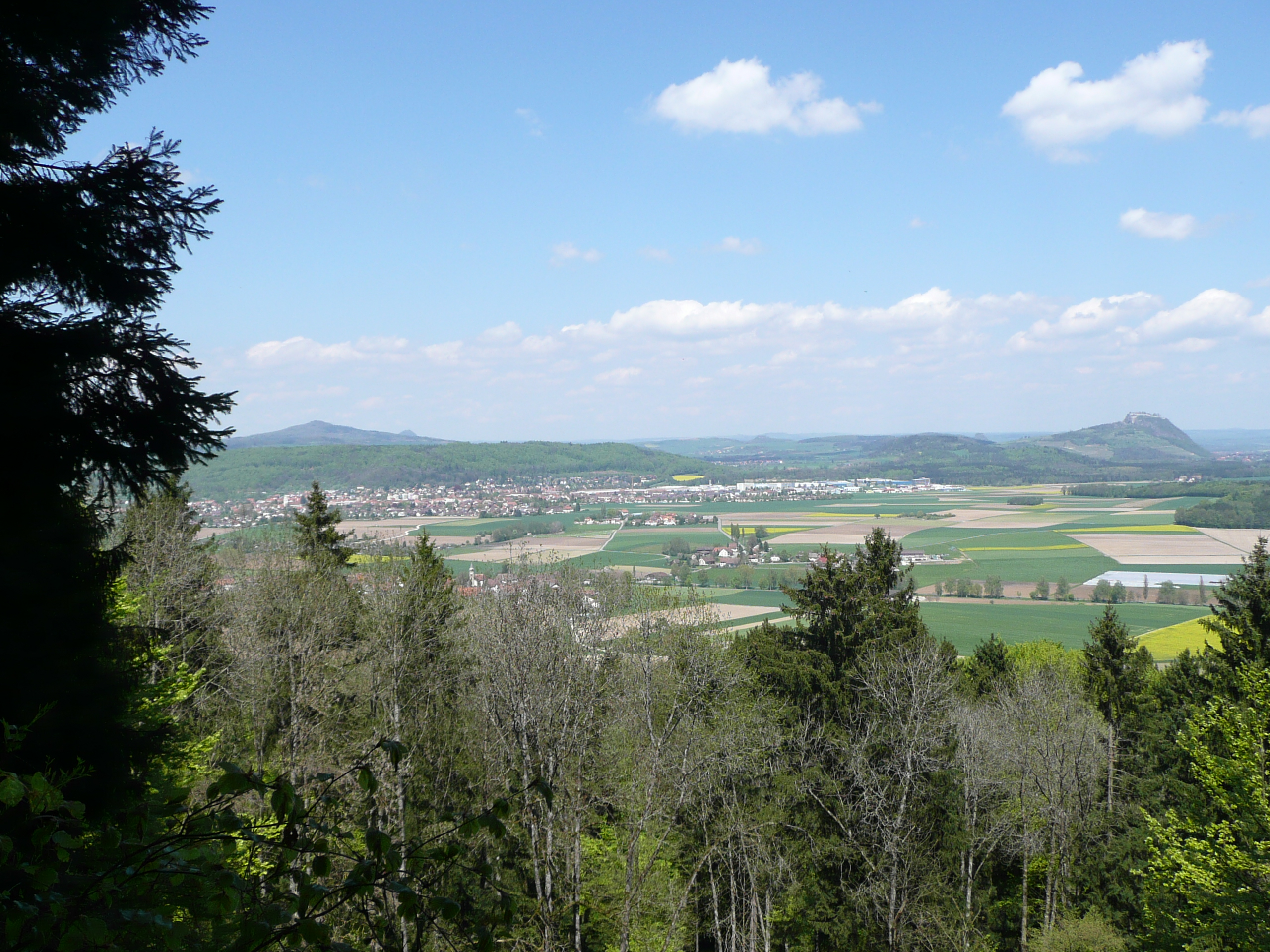
View of Biber Valley in the Hegau from the Buchemer Säntis; Hohentwiel can be seen on the right

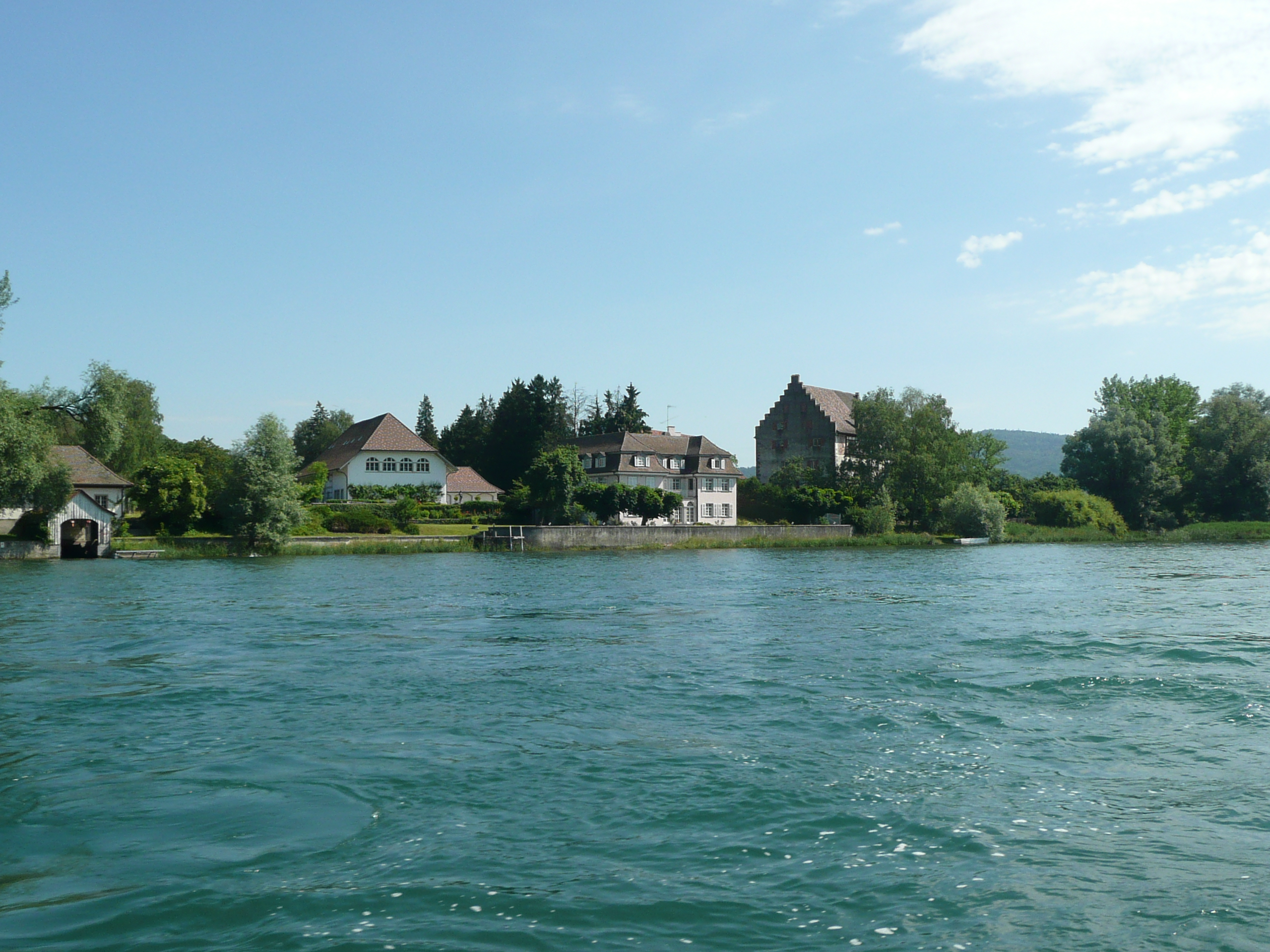
The Biber Mill at the mouth of the Biber

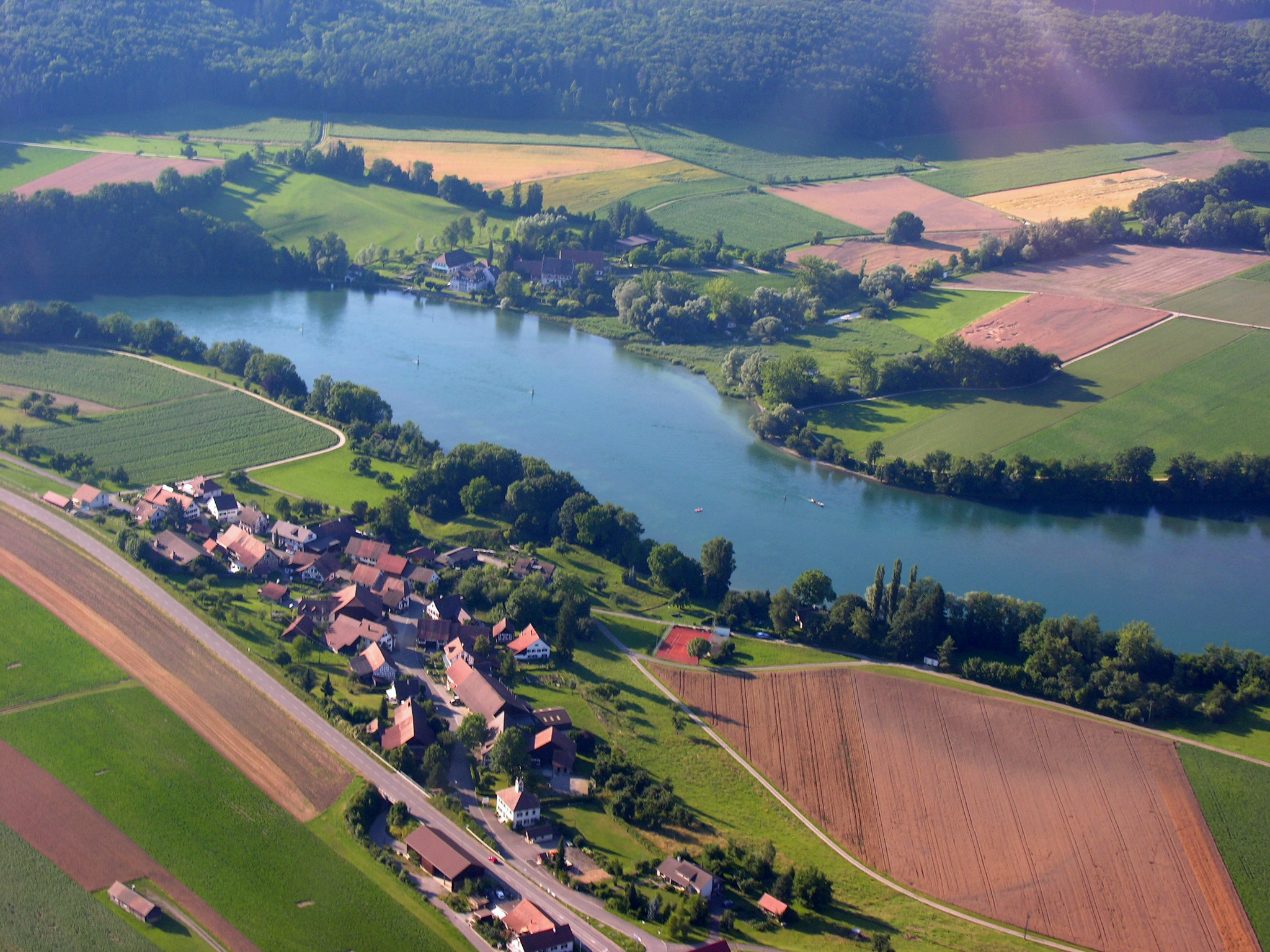
Rheinklingen and Biber Mill; the Biber can be seen in the top right

== Biber correction ==
The area between Buch and the mouth of the Biber is flat and mostly use for agriculture. It was frequently flooded by the Biber. To correct this, the canton of Schaffhausen altered the course of the river in several stages between 1902 and 1907. Many of the countless loops of the river were straightened. The old loops were filled with material excavated from the new course of the river.

== Beavers ==
The German name Biber means beaver. Presumably, the river was named after the animal.

Beavers were eradicated in the watershed of the Biber over 150 years ago. Around the turn of the millennium, the animals have repopulated the river. They were first spotted in the estuary and the lower reaches. They then moved into the Randegg/Bietinge area. In 2005, beaver tracks were found in Bibern. These animals probably came from the valley of the Thur, crossed the Rhine and gradually followed the Biber upstream.

== See also ==
- List of rivers of Germany
- List of rivers of Switzerland
