= Hemishofen =

- Municipality
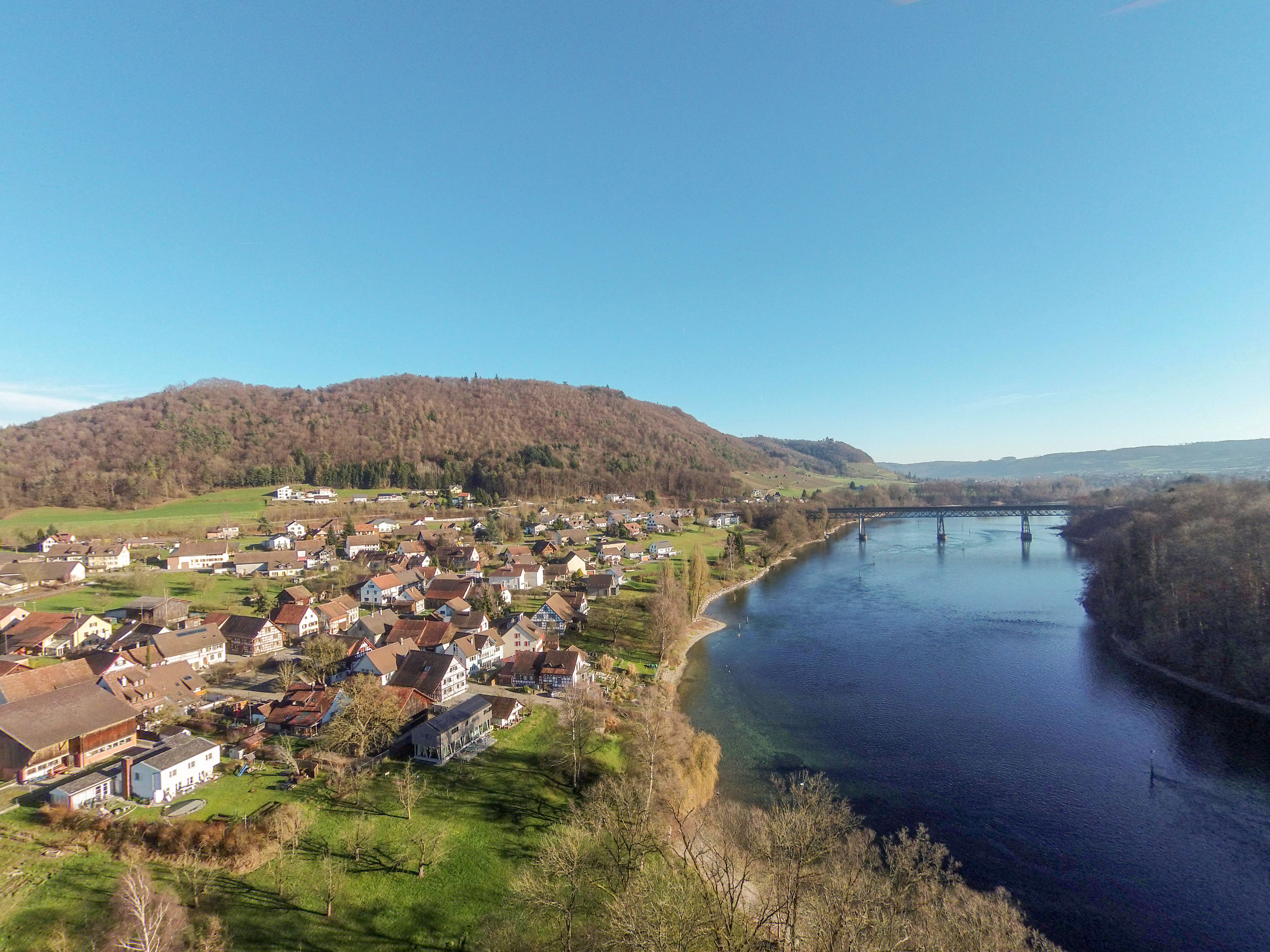

- Flag Coat of arms
- Location of Hemishofen
- Location within Switzerland Location within Canton of Schaffhausen
- Coordinates: 47°40′N 8°49′E
- Country: Switzerland
- Canton: Schaffhausen
- District: n.a.

Area
  - Total: 7.88 km^{2} (3.04 sq mi)
- Elevation: 401 m (1,316 ft)

Population (December 2008)
  - Total: 415
  - Density: 52.7/km^{2} (136/sq mi)
- Time zone: UTC+01:00 (CET)
  - Summer (DST): UTC+02:00 (CEST)
- Postal code: 8261
- SFOS number: 2962
- ISO 3166 code: CH-SH
- Surrounded by: Öhningen (DE-BW), Ramsen, Rielasingen-Worblingen (DE-BW), Singen (DE-BW), Stein am Rhein, Wagenhausen (TG)
- Website: www.hemishofen.ch

Hemishofen is a municipality in the canton of Schaffhausen in Switzerland.

== History ==
Aerial view (1954)

The Iron Age grave sites at Sankert indicate that this area has been settled since 800-600 BC. However, Hemishofen is first mentioned after about 1100 as Hammingeshoven.

== Coat of arms ==
The blazon of the municipal coat of arms is Per pale Or and Gules overall a branch with five leaves Vert issuant from base.

== Geography ==
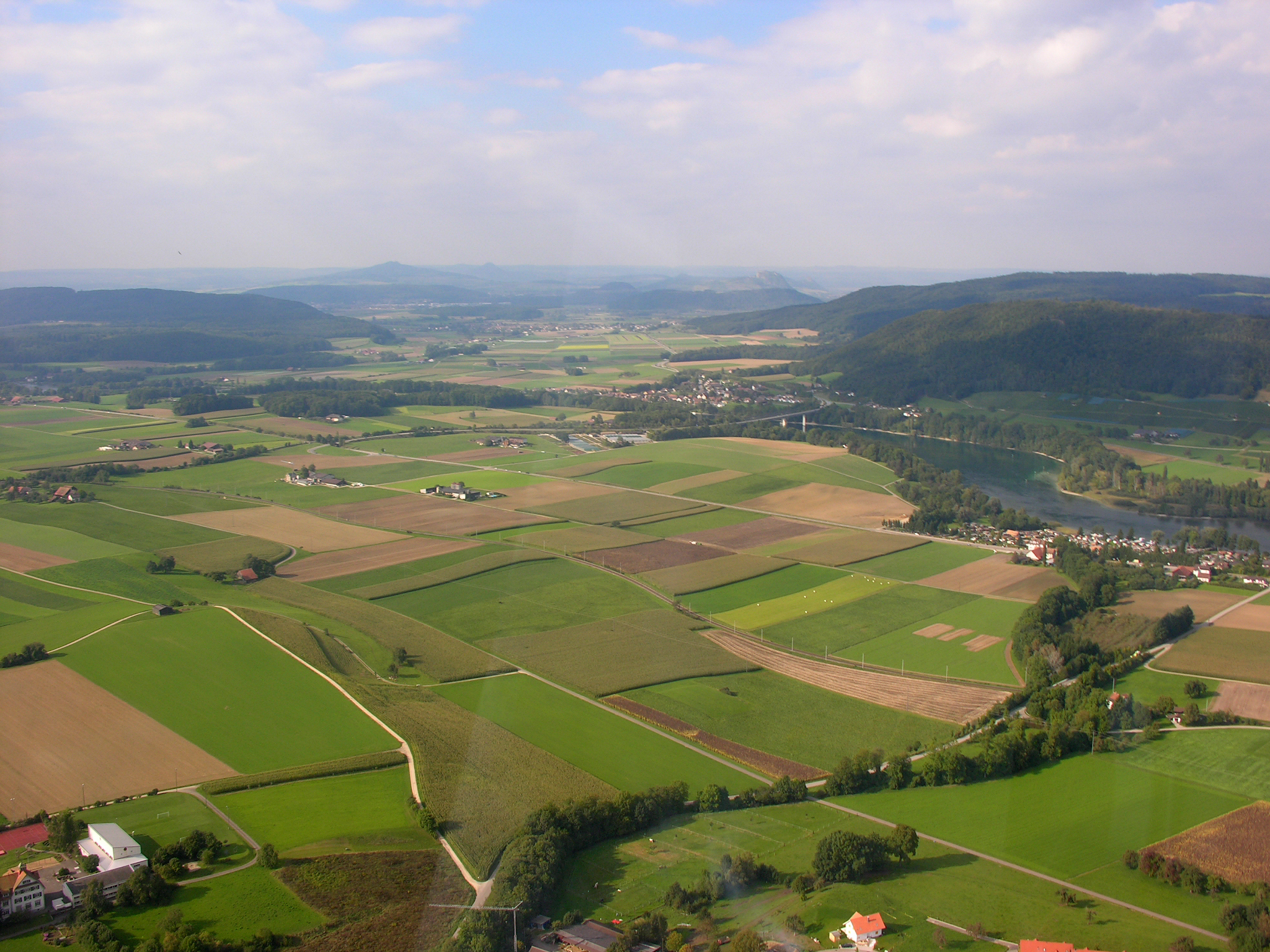
Aerial view of the countryside, with the Rhine river on the right and Hemishofen in the background.

Hemishofen has an area, as of 2006, of 7.9 km^{2} (3.1 sq mi). Of this area, 35.8% is used for agricultural purposes, while 54.7% is forested. Of the rest of the land, 5.9% is settled (buildings or roads) and the remainder (3.7%) is non-productive (rivers or lakes).

The municipality is located in the Stein district. Hemishofen is located along the Rhine River. The village sits at the foot of the Wolkensteinerberg, while the municipality stretches north to Herrentisch. The municipalities of Hemishofen, and Stein am Rhein are considered a merger for some time in the future into a new municipality with an as yet (as of 2008) undetermined name.

== Demographics ==
Hemishofen has a population (as of 2008) of 415, of which 11.8% are foreign nationals. Of the foreign population, (as of 2008), 56.3% are from Germany, 8.3% are from Italy, 2.1% are from Croatia, and 33.3% are from another country. Over the last 10 years the population has grown at a rate of 19.6%. Most of the population (as of 2000) speaks German (97.9%), with French being second most common ( 0.8%) and English being third ( 0.5%). The age distribution of the population (as of 2008) is children and teenagers (0–19 years old) make up 23.6% of the population, while adults (20–64 years old) make up 56.1% and seniors (over 64 years old) make up 20.2%.

In the 2007 federal election the most popular party was the SVP which received 54.8% of the vote. The next two most popular parties were the SP (26.8%), and the FDP (18.4%) .

The entire Swiss population is generally well educated. In Hemishofen about 85.9% of the population (between age 25-64) have completed either non-mandatory upper secondary education or additional higher education (either university or a Fachhochschule). In Hemishofen, as of 2007, 2.68% of the population attend kindergarten or another pre-school, 8.76% attend a Primary School, 4.62% attend a lower level Secondary School, and 3.65% attend a higher level Secondary School.

As of 2000, 15.6% of the population belonged to the Roman Catholic Church and 71.1% belonged to the Swiss Reformed Church.

The historical population is given in the following table:

year	population
1850	327
1900	376
1950	307
1970	271
2000	377

== Economy ==
Hemishofen has an unemployment rate of 1.98%. As of 2005, there were 43 people employed in the primary economic sector and about 12 businesses involved in this sector. 11 people are employed in the secondary sector and there are 5 businesses in this sector. 8 people are employed in the tertiary sector, with 4 businesses in this sector.

As of 2008 the mid year average unemployment rate was 0.4%. There were 12 non-agrarian businesses in the municipality and 18.4% of the (non-agrarian) population was involved in the secondary sector of the economy while 81.6% were involved in the third. At the same time, 60.5% of the working population was employed full-time, and 39.5% was employed part-time. There were 38 residents of the municipality who were employed in some capacity, of which females made up 39.5% of the workforce. As of 2000 there were 63 residents who worked in the municipality, while 122 residents worked outside Hemishofen and 18 people commuted into the municipality for work.

As of 2008, there is 1 restaurant in Hemishofen and the hospitality industry employs 4 people.

== Transport ==
There is a railway station in Hemishofen on the cross-border Museumsbahn (Etzwilen–Singen railway line), which is not served by regular trains. The village is also served by a bus route, Südbadenbus line 33 / 7349 to Stein am Rhein and to Ramsen / Singen (Hohentwiel).

== Heritage sites of national significance ==
The Iron Age grave sites at Sankert are listed as a Swiss heritage site of national significance.

The graves are located in a group of tumuli on the eastern edge of the lower Biber valley at the foot of the Schienerberg. The first discovery of the graves was in 1836 by Ferdinand Keller. In 1846 and 1856 there were further excavations by Johann Conrad Fehrlin. Additional excavations happened in 1874-75 by the preacher Julius Müller, 1894 by Ferdinand Schalch. In 1912-13 there was an unauthorized dig by Joseph von Sury and Bertram Böschenstein, then in 1943 Walter Ulrich Guyan explored the entire site and further digs occurred in 1967 and 1978.

The group contains at least 35 tumuli. Some of the graves contain items from the 8th through 6th Centuries BC Hallstatt culture, while others are from the 5th and 4th Century BC La Tène culture. Each of the bodies was buried with personal items including jewelry, eating utensils and weapons. Many were also buried with food and drink in ceramic vessels. Due to the numerous excavations and limited records, many of the items can not linked to a specific grave. The location of the village that was associated with these graves is unknown.
