= Hofenacker =

Hofenacker is a small hamlet, which belongs to the Swiss municipality of Ramsen, in the eastern part of the canton of Schaffhausen.

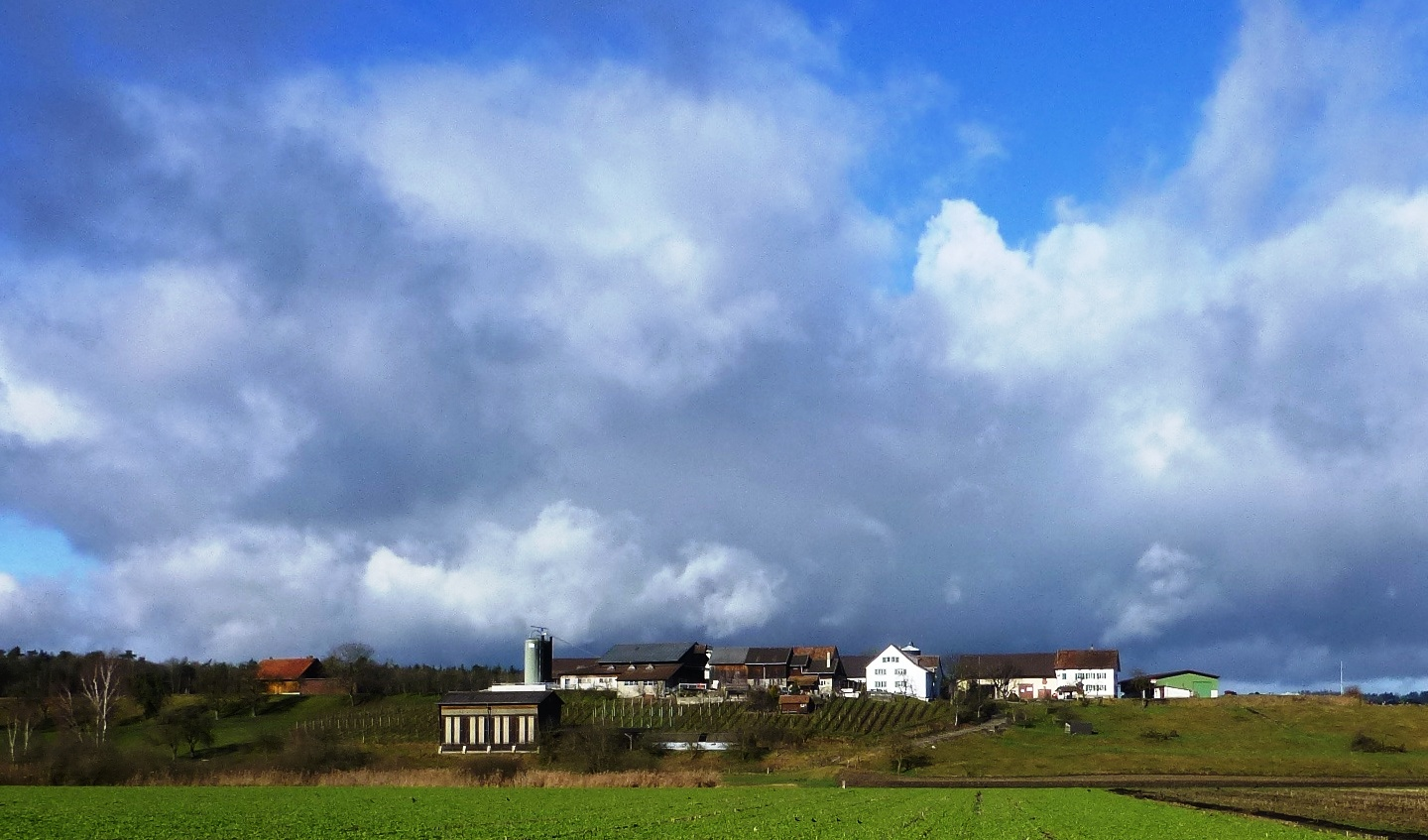
Hofenacker as seen from German territory (Rielasingen), east of it

== Geography/Location ==
As of December 31, 2012, Hofenacker had 22 inhabitants. Its distance to the centre of the municipality is about 1.7 miles, while it is only 160 yards from the nearest Swiss-German border marker and only 0.6 miles from Spiesshof, a former farmhouse and restaurant exactly on the border and next to the German road between Singen and Gottmadingen.

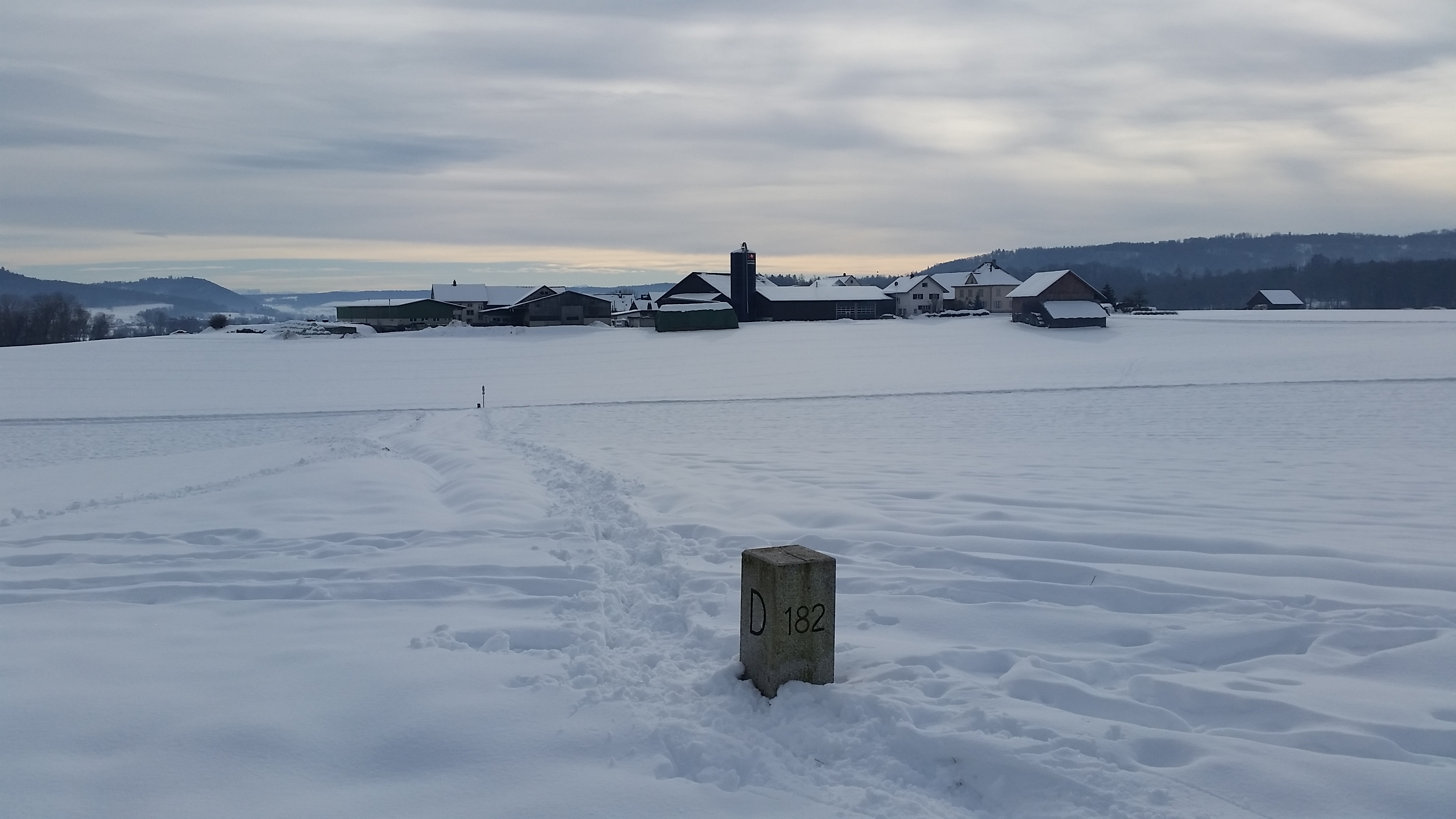
Hofenacker as seen from the north with a Swiss-German border marker in the foreground

== Hofenacker's importance in connection with the 'Singen Route' ==
Between April 1941 and October 1943, at least 19 escaped Allied POW officers and soldiers (Dutch, British, Canadian), most of them coming from Colditz, reached Ramsen, Switzerland, after having crossed the border west of Spiesshof. Hofenacker was an important landmark for them as they knew that they had to keep west of it near a forest, in order not to stray back into a salient of German territory east of it. Airey Neave and Pat Reid were among these escapees.

Border guard patrol in Hofenacker

during World War One

== History ==
In 1293 Hofenacker appears in a document as 'Offenacker'. Until 1800, there was a brickyard. Clay for fabrication of the bricks was available in the vicinity. There was a vineyard in medieval times which disappeared over the centuries. There is a new vineyard, however, which produces the only Ramsen Wine. The types of grape are Pinot noir and Müller-Thurgau.
