= Rumsen =

Rumsen, Rumsien, or San Carlos Costanoan may refer to:

- Rumsen people, an ethnic group of California
- Rumsen language, a language of California

== See also ==
- Ramsen (disambiguation)
