= Hemishofen railway station =

Train station in Switzerland

Hemishofen
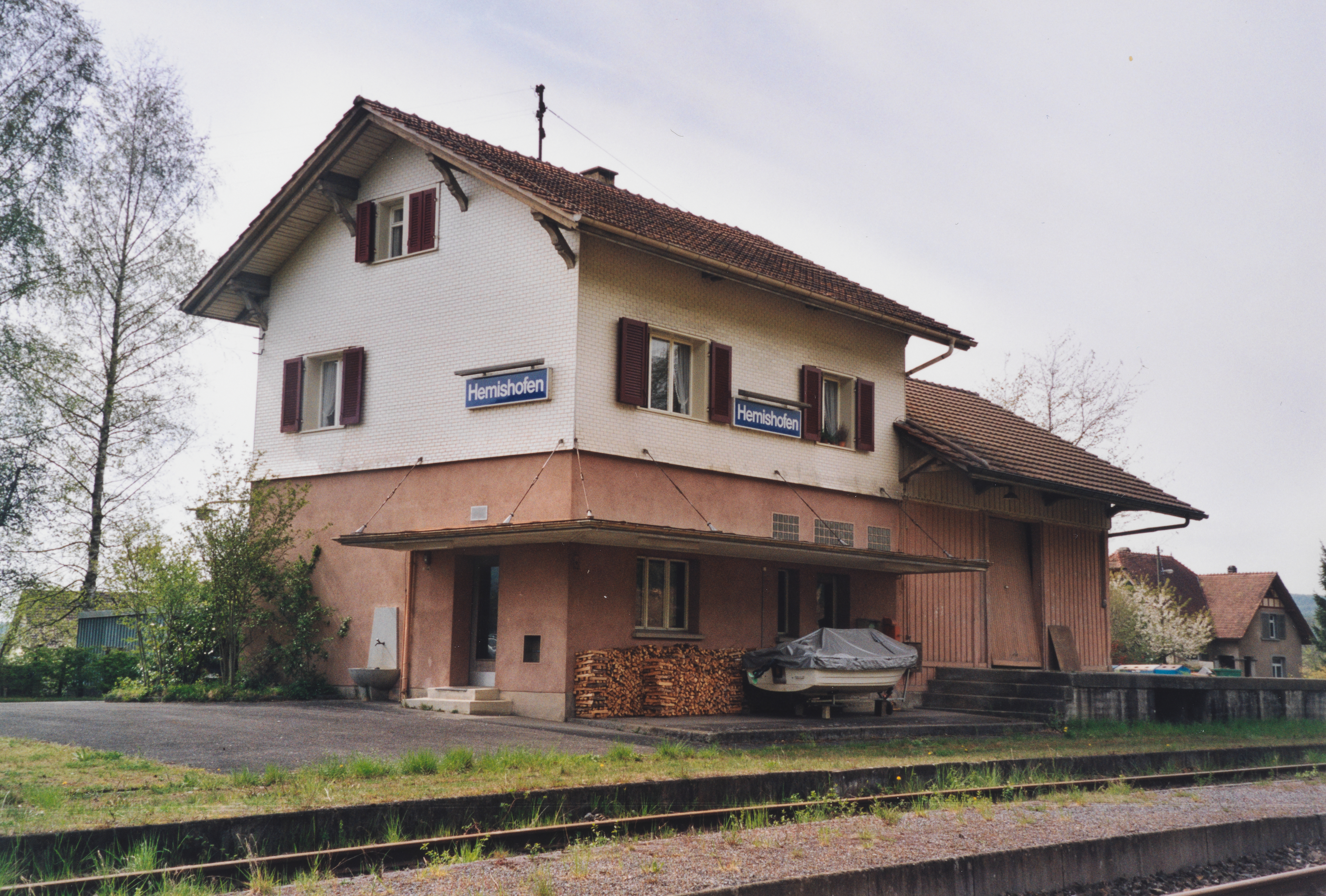
- The station building in 2003

General information
- Other names: Bahnhof Hemishofen
- Location: Bahnhofstrasse 5, Hemishofen; Switzerland
- Coordinates: 47°40′41″N 8°49′59″E
- Elevation: 401 m (1,316 ft)
- Operator: Museumsbahn SEHR & RS
- Line: Etzwilen–Singen railway
- Platforms: 1
- Tracks: 3 (German: Gleis)

Construction
- Structure type: at-grade
- Platform levels: 1
Location
- Location within Switzerland Location within Canton of Schaffhausen

Hemishofen railway station (German: Bahnhof Hemishofen) is a railway station in the municipality of Hemishofen in the eastern part of the canton of Schaffhausen, Switzerland. It is situated between Etzwilen and Ramsen on the Etzwilen–Singen railway line, which is closed to regular passenger train services since 1969. Since 2007, the station has been served only by heritage trains.
