= Joseph Jung =

Swiss historian and publicist

Joseph Jung (born in 1955 in Ramsen) is a Swiss historian and publicist.

== Life and career ==
Jung studied Swiss history, modern general history, legal history, and German language and literature at the University of Fribourg, where he earned his doctorate in 1987 under Urs Altermatt, with a dissertation on the Catholic youth movement in German-speaking Switzerland. In 1998, he qualified as a professor at ETH Zurich, where he was a private lecturer until 2006. From 2001 to 2012, he taught at the University of Fribourg, where he remains a titular professor. Since 2014, he has been a lecturer and visiting professor at various universities, including the University of St. Gallen. In addition to his academic work, Jung was managing director and head of research at the Alfred Escher Foundation (2006 to 2016). Until the end of 2014, Jung was chief historian at large Swiss bank Credit Suisse. He was also founding managing director and member of the board of trustees of the Credit Suisse-affiliated non-profit foundations Accentus, Empiris, and Symphasis (2000 to 2016). He continues to hold management positions in various foundations and institutions. He is managing director of the Ulrico Hoepli Foundation. Since 2015, he has been running a consulting firm in Walchwil in the fields of economics, society, culture, and history. He is a member of various scientific and socio-political associations.

== Recognition ==
In 2023, the Swiss Association for Economic History Studies (Verein für wirtschaftshistorische Studien) published Spirit of ’48. Ehrengabe für Joseph Jung, a book of essays (edited by Lukas Gschwend, Gerhard Schwarz and Lukas Fässler) honoring Jung’s work. In its coverage of the issuance of this award, Swiss daily newspaper Schaffhauser Nachrichten described him as "a pioneer of Swiss history".

In 2023, Swiss weekly Schaffhauser AZ published an article titled The Legacy of Joseph Jung, a feature piece focusing on Jung’s career, public role, and scholarly output.

=== Work on Alfred Escher ===
Jung’s long‑running biographical scholarship on 19th century Swiss business magnate and politician Alfred Escher has been subject to both praise and criticism by fellow commentators. Two biographical books on Escher and his wife Lydia Welti-Escher became bestsellers in Switzerland.

In 2020, during the worldwide discussion about the implications of colonialism elicited by the rise of the Black Lives Matter movement, Jung publicly defended Escher’s legacy against allegations that he and his family profited from colonial slave labor in 19th century Cuba. Jung stated that "Alfred Escher was never in Cuba and didn't own any slaves. The debate centered around one of his uncles... A Zurich court ruled in 1846 that Escher's father neither held slaves nor was involved in the sale trade". These statements were criticized by journalist Res Jehle who stated that newly emerged documents prove that the Escher family fortune was partially built on the foundation of slave labour and that the legacy of Alfred Escher in Switzerland cannot be decoupled from the overall fortune of his family as a whole.

== Published works ==
Books

- Das Laboratorium des Fortschritts. Die Schweiz im 19. Jahrhundert. 2. Edition. NZZ Libro, Zürich 2020, ISBN 978-3-03810-435-3.
- Hans Künzi. Operations Research und Verkehrspolitik. NZZ Libro, Zürich 2017, ISBN 978-3-03810-285-4.
- Alfred Escher 1819–1882. Aufstieg, Macht, Tragik. 6. Edition. Verlag Neue Zürcher Zeitung NZZ Libro, Zürich 2017, ISBN 978-3-03823-876-8.
- Lydia Welti-Escher (1858–1891). Biographie. 5. Aufl. Verlag Neue Zürcher Zeitung NZZ Libro, Zürich 2016, ISBN 978-3-03823-852-2.
  - Lydia Welti-Escher (1858–1891). Biographie. Quellen, Materialien und Beiträge. Significantly expanded new edition. Verlag Neue Zürcher Zeitung, Zürich 2009, ISBN 978-3-03823-557-6.
- Switzerland’s success story. The life and work of Alfred Escher (1819–1882). Verlag Neue Zürcher Zeitung, Zürich 2015, ISBN 978-3-03810-051-5.
- Alfred Escher. Il fondatore della Svizzera moderna. Armando Dadò Editore, Locarno 2013, ISBN 978-88-8281-369-7.
- Lydia Welti-Escher (1858–1891). Biographie. Verlag Neue Zürcher Zeitung NZZ Libro, Zürich 2013, ISBN 978-3-03823-852-2.
- Alfred Escher. Un fondateur de la Suisse moderne. presse polytechniques et universitaires romandes, Lausanne 2012, ISBN 978-2-88074-972-9.
- Rainer E. Gut. Die kritische Grösse. NZZ Libro, Zürich 2007, ISBN 978-3-03823-397-8.
- Von der Schweizerischen Kreditanstalt zur Credit Suisse Group. Eine Bankengeschichte. 2. Aufl. Verlag Neue Zürcher Zeitung, Zürich 2000, ISBN 3-85823-815-5.
- Die Winterthur. Eine Versicherungsgeschichte. Verlag Neue Zürcher Zeitung, Zürich 2000, ISBN 3-85823-854-6.
- Das imaginäre Museum. Privates Kunstengagement und staatliche Kulturpolitik in der Schweiz. Die Gottfried Keller-Stiftung 1890–1922. Verlag Neue Zürcher Zeitung, Zürich 1998, ISBN 3-85823-681-0.

Essays

- Das helvetische Weltwunder. Wie die Schweiz von einem Land, das den Anschluss verloren hatte, zu einem modernen Staat wurde: die Geschichte der Gotthardbahn, in der ein gewisser Alfred Escher die Rolle seines Lebens spielte. In: Bulletin (Bank Magazine of Credit Suisse). Nr. 2, 2016, p. 21–24.
- To beautify and ornament Zurich. Credit Suisse’s head office on Paradeplatz. In: bulletin (Magazine of The European Association for Banking and Financial History e. V.) 2016, S. 135–137.
- Projekt Schweiz oder der «Spirit of 48». Zürich 2014.
- Zürichs Herrscher und der Asylant. In: Neue Zürcher Zeitung. 13. Juni 2013, Sonderbeilage Wagner Festspiele, Zürich 2013.
- Das wirtschaftsliberale Zeitfenster des jungen Bundesstaates begründet die Erfolgsgeschichte Schweiz. In: Joseph Jung (Hrsg.): Schweizer Erfolgsgeschichten. Pioniere, Unternehmen, Innovationen (= Schweizer Pioniere der Wirtschaft und Technik. Volume 100). Verlag Neue Zürcher Zeitung, Zürich 2013, ISBN 978-3-03823-851-5.
- Schweizer Revolutionär. In: Schweizer Monat. 11/2013, Aargau 2013.
- Imagination und Illuminierung. Gedanken zur Schweiz, zur Bergmalerei und zu Valentin Roschachers Alpenpanorama. In: Renato Compostella, Res Perrot (Hrsg.): Valentin Roschacher. Die Schweizer Alpen. Ölbilder 2000–2013. Benteli Verlag, Sulgen 2013, ISBN 978-3-7165-1772-7.
- Verbrüderung für eine neue Schweiz. In: Weltwoche. 22/2011, Zürich 2011.
