= Ferdinand Schalch =

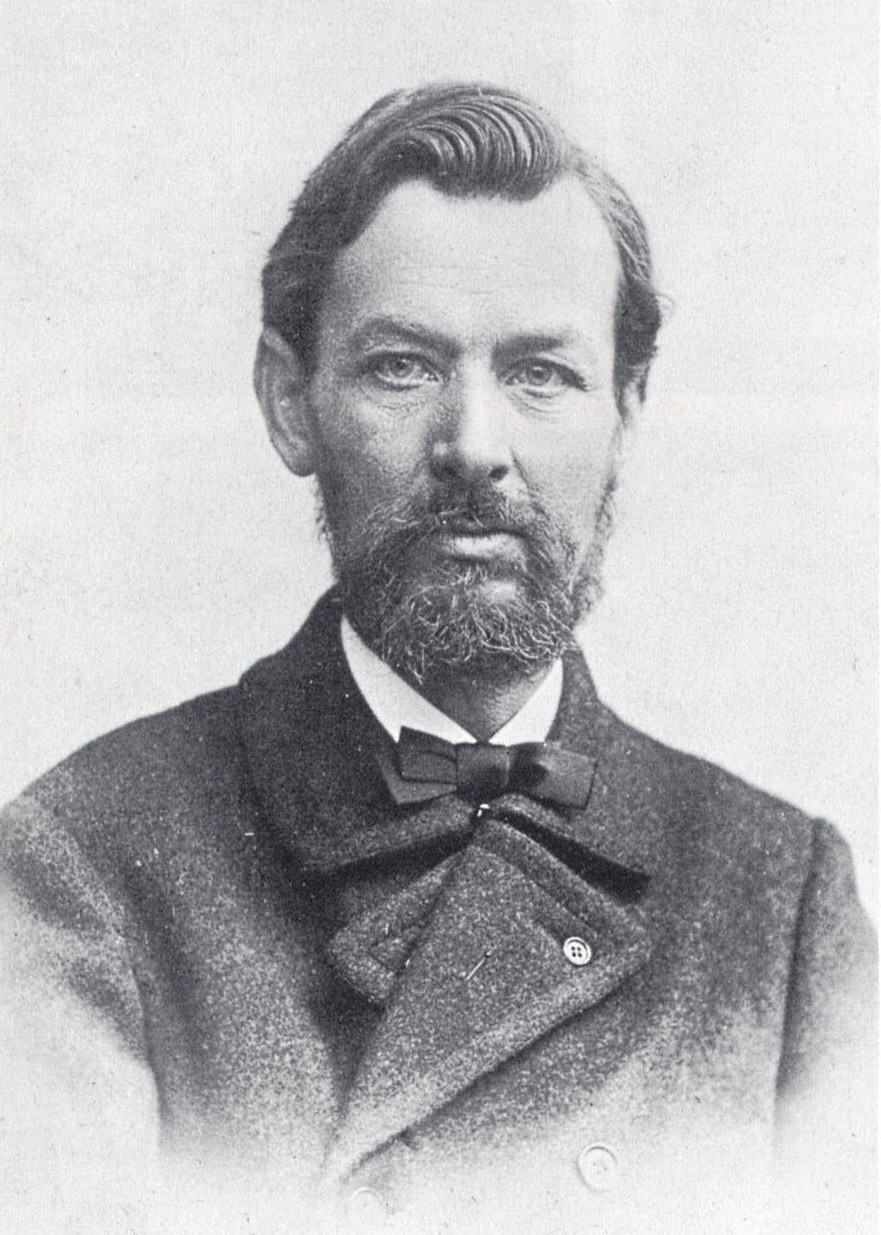
Portrait, c. 1890

Johann Ferdinand Schalch (11 January 1848 – 19 November 1918) was a Swiss paleontologist and geologist. He conducted stratigraphic studies of Thuringia, Saxony, Baden, and the Black Forest regions and produced numerous maps. His fossil and geological collections were damaged when the Schaffhausen museum was bombed during World War II.

== Life and work ==
Schalch was the son of Katharina Juditha née Mägis and school teacher Ferdinand in Schaffhausen. He studied natural sciences at Zurich Polytechnic. Here he was influenced by Arnold Escher von der Linth and Oswald Heer. This was followed by studies at the universities of Würzburg and Heidelberg leading to a doctorate in 1870 under Fridolin Sandberger with a dissertation on the Triassic in the southeastern Black Forest. He then became a teacher in Böckten and from 1876 he worked at the Geological Institute in Leipzig. He then moved to Saxony to work with Hermann Credner from 1876. He conducted stratigraphic studies and produced geological maps of the region. In 1888 Harry Rosenbusch appointed him and Adolf Sauer to the Baden Geological Institute. He published several maps, treatises on rocks and fossils. He retired in 1918 and returned to Schaffhausen where he suffered from psychiatric problems and was sent for treatment to Küssnacht where he committed suicide. He donated his collections to the museum in the town of Schaffhausen but many of his collections were destroyed by bombing during World War II.
