= Remsen =

Remsen may refer to:

== Places in the United States ==
- Remsen, Iowa, a community in Plymouth County
- Remsen, New York, a town in Oneida County
- Remsen (village), New York, a village located within the town of Remsen
- Remsen, New Jersey, a town located in Woodbridge township

== People with the surname ==
- Bert Remsen (1925–1999), American actor
- Ira Remsen, the discoverer of saccharin
- James Van Remsen Jr. (1949–), American ornithologist

== See also ==
- Remsen Stakes, an American Thoroughbred horse race
