= Ramsen, Schaffhausen =

Ramsen
- Municipality
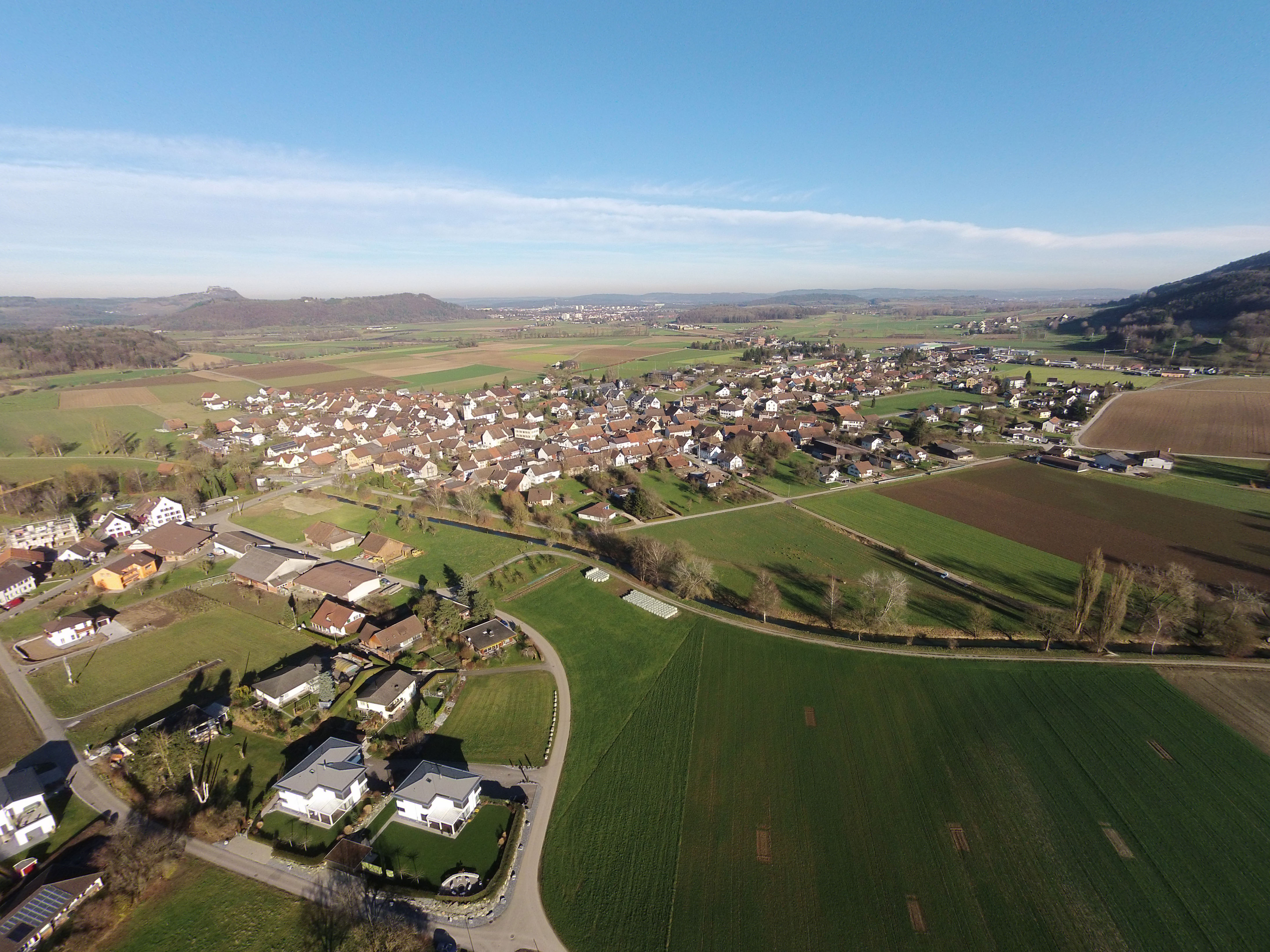

- Coat of arms
- Location of Ramsen
- Location within Switzerland Location within Canton of Schaffhausen
- Coordinates: 47°42′N 8°48′E
- Country: Switzerland
- Canton: Schaffhausen
- District: n.a.

Area
  - Total: 13.45 km^{2} (5.19 sq mi)
- Elevation: 413 m (1,355 ft)

Population (December 2008)
  - Total: 1,299
  - Density: 96.58/km^{2} (250.1/sq mi)
- Time zone: UTC+01:00 (CET)
  - Summer (DST): UTC+02:00 (CEST)
- Postal code: 8262
- SFOS number: 2963
- ISO 3166 code: CH-SH
- Surrounded by: Buch, Diessenhofen (TG), Gailingen am Hochrhein (DE-BW), Gottmadingen (DE-BW), Hemishofen, Rielasingen-Worblingen (DE-BW), Wagenhausen (TG)
- Website: www.ramsen.ch

Ramsen (Swiss Standard German pronunciation: [ˈramsn̩]) is a municipality in the canton of Schaffhausen in northern Switzerland.

== History ==
Ramsen is first mentioned in 846 as Rammesheim. In the Middle Ages, the village belonged to the Habsburg Landgraviate of Nellenburg. In 1539 the lower jurisdiction passed from the Lords of Klingenberg to the town of Stein am Rhein, which was under the sovereignty of Zurich. Zurich finally acquired high jurisdiction over Ramsen in 1770. In 1798, as part of the Helvetic Republic, Ramsen, together with Stein, became part of the canton of Schaffhausen. As a border town, Ramsen was the end point of the Singen escape route during the Second World War, an escape route for Dutch and British officers taken prisoner of war who found their way from the Colditz Castle prison camp in Saxony via Singen to Switzerland. After the war, it was an important entry point for refugees, who were housed in the Catholic church and in the Schüppelwald.

== Coat of arms ==
The blazon of the municipal coat of arms is Azure three Ears of Wheat leaved Or issuant from a Mount of the same.

== Geography ==
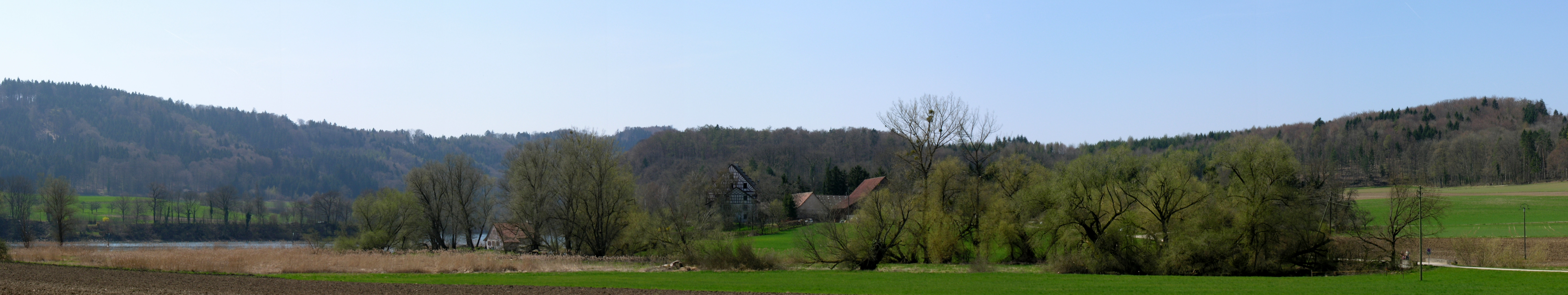
Rhine River near Bibermühle village (part of Ramsen municipality)

Ramsen is located in the Biber valley directly on the German border and has an area of as of 2025, of 13.45 km^{2} (5.19 sq mi). Of this area, 62.2% is used for agricultural purposes, while 28.9% is forested. Of the rest of the land, 7.3% is settled (buildings or roads) and the remainder (1.6%) is non-productive (rivers or lakes). The municipality is located in the Stein district which is in the eastern exclave of the canton of Schaffhausen. It consists of the farming village of Ramsen and several hamlets including Bibermühle and Hofenacker.

== Demographics ==
Ramsen has a population (as of 2008) of 1,299, of which 17.4% are foreign nationals. Of the foreign population, (as of 2008), 59.4% are from Germany, 1.3% are from Italy, 0.4% are from Croatia, 8.5% are from Serbia, 12% are from Macedonia, 0.4% are from Turkey, and 17.9% are from another country. Over the last 10 years the population has grown at a rate of 6.4%. Most of the population (as of 2000) speaks German (95.6%), with Albanian being second most common ( 1.9%) and French being third ( 0.4%).

The age distribution of the population (as of 2008) is children and teenagers (0–19 years old) make up 21.2% of the population, while adults (20–64 years old) make up 59.4% and seniors (over 64 years old) make up 19.4%.

In the 2007 federal election the most popular party was the SVP which received 55.1% of the vote. The next two most popular parties were the FDP (24.3%), and the SP (20.6%) .

In Ramsen about 76.4% of the population (between age 25–64) have completed either non-mandatory upper secondary education or additional higher education (either university or a Fachhochschule). In Ramsen, as of 2007, 1.78% of the population attend kindergarten or another pre-school, 8.06% attend a Primary School, 4.11% attend a lower level Secondary School, and 3.56% attend a higher level Secondary School.

As of 2000, 45.5% of the population belonged to the Roman Catholic Church and 38.6% belonged to the Swiss Reformed Church.

The historical population is given in the following table:

year	population
1653	273
1798	494
1850	1,022
1900	1,209
1950	1,103
2000	1,283

== Notable people ==
- Mathias Gnädinger (1941–2015)
- Joseph Jung (1955-)

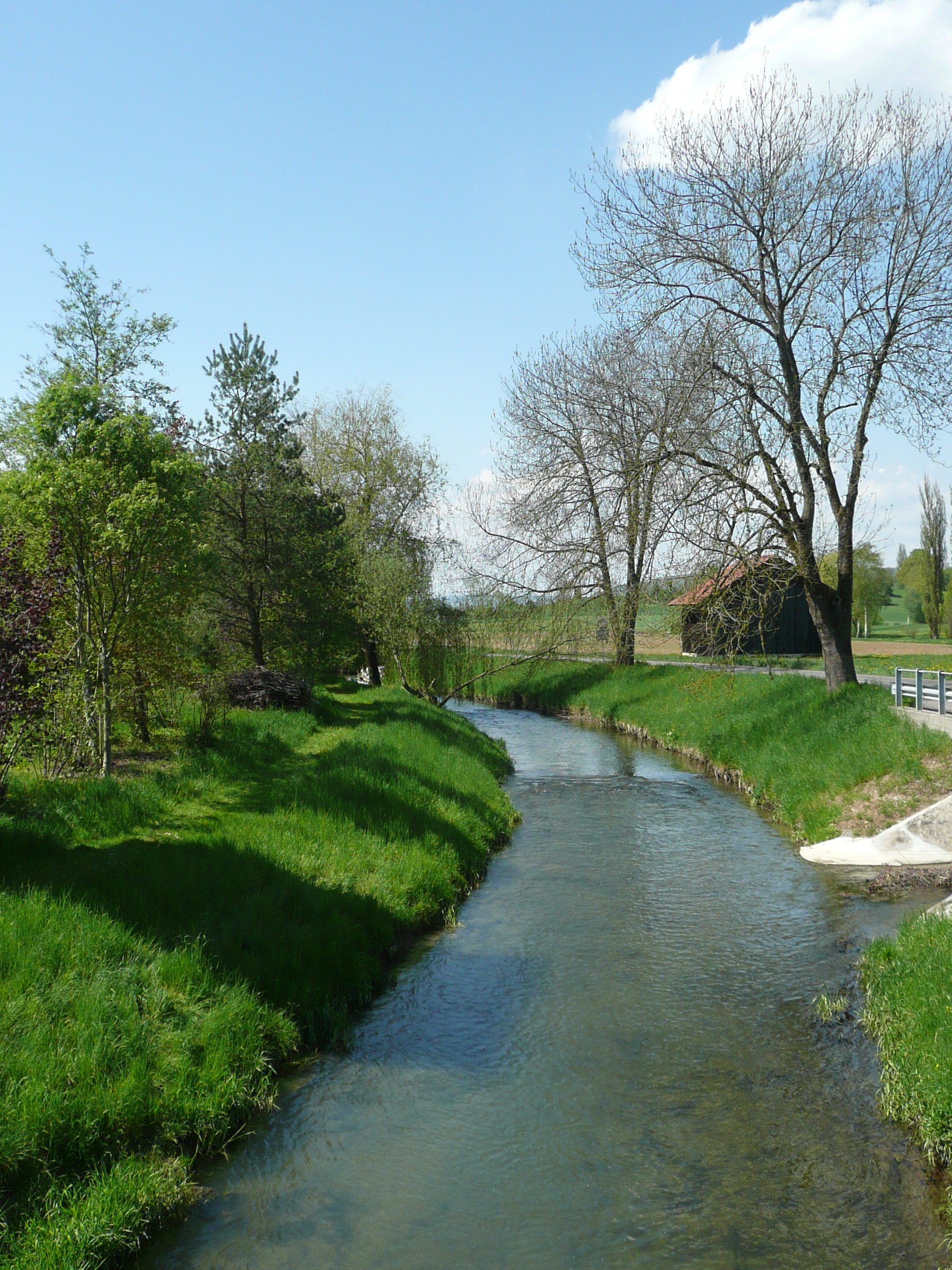
Biber river near Ramsen

== Economy and Infrastructure ==
Ramsen has an unemployment rate (as of 2007 of 1.63%. As of 2005, there were 113 people employed in the primary economic sector and about 37 businesses involved in this sector. 111 people are employed in the secondary sector and there are 20 businesses in this sector. 597 people are employed in the tertiary sector, with 69 businesses in this sector.

As of 2008 the mid year average unemployment rate was 1.4%. There were 89 non-agrarian businesses in the municipality and 16.7% of the (non-agrarian) population was involved in the secondary sector of the economy while 83.3% were involved in the third. At the same time, 66.8% of the working population was employed full-time, and 33.2% was employed part-time. There were 743 residents of the municipality who were employed in some capacity, of which females made up 47.5% of the workforce. As of 2000 there were 295 residents who worked in the municipality, while 283 residents worked outside Ramsen and 220 people commuted into the municipality for work.

As of 2008, there are 4 restaurants, and 1 hotel with 36 beds. The hospitality industry in Ramsen employs 12 people.

== Heritage sites of national significance ==
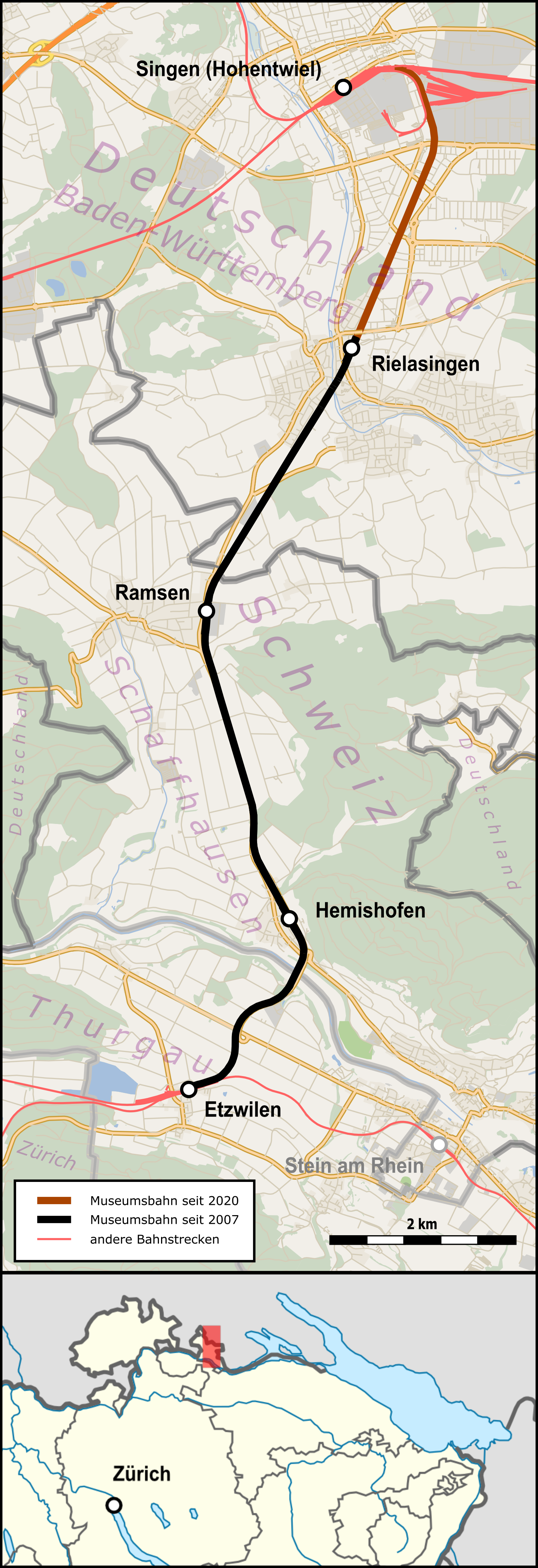
Bahnstrecke Etzwilen–Singen

The manor house Bibernhofgut in the village of Bibermühle is listed as a Swiss heritage site of national significance.

Bibernhofgut is an old manor house along the Rhine River. The late-Gothic main building was finished in 1529. The fresco on the south façade, featuring the coat of arms of Stein am Rhein, is from the early 17th Century. The estate ground also include a water mill. While the house was owned by the city of Stein am Rhein for centuries, it is currently privately owned.

Ramsen has some fame as the preferred border crossing point for British and Dutch prisoners of war escaping from Germany during the Second World War.

== Transport ==
There is a railway station in Ramsen on the cross-border Museumsbahn (Etzwilen–Singen railway line), which is not served by regular trains. The village is also served by two bus routes, vbsh bus route 25 to Schaffhausen and Südbadenbus line 33 / 7349 to Stein am Rhein and Singen (Hohentwiel).
