= Etzwilen–Singen railway =

Heritage railway line in Switzerland and Germany

Etzwilen–Singen railway line
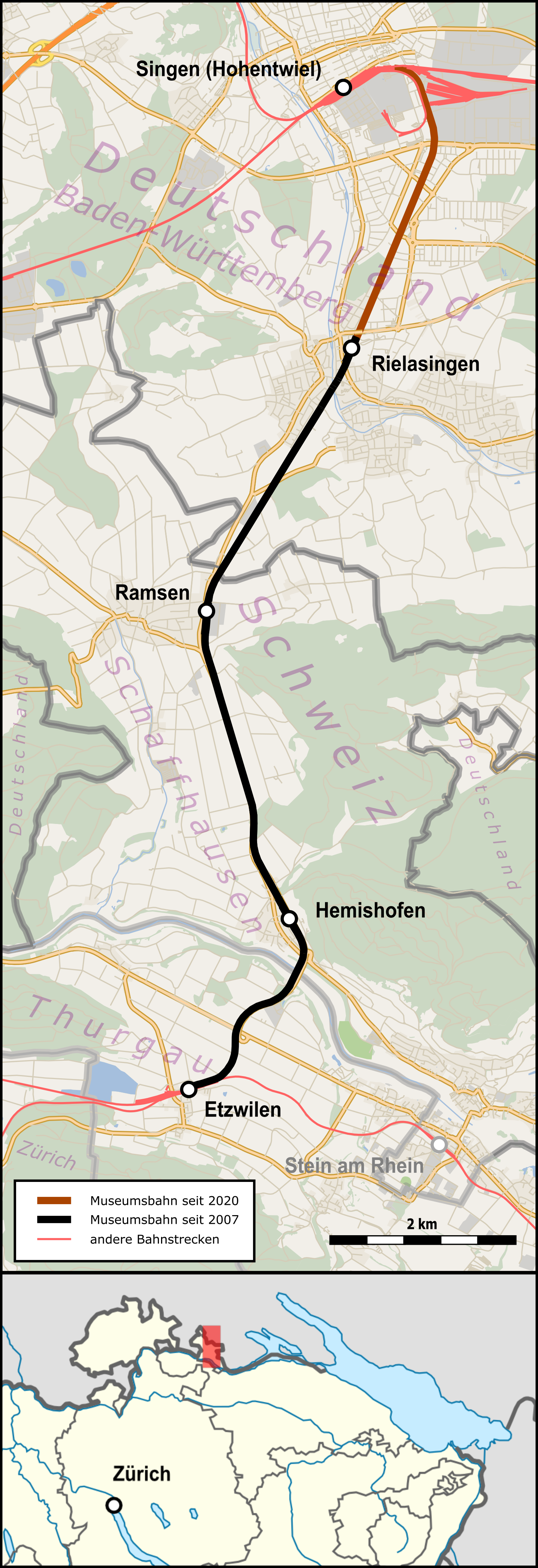

Overview
- Native name: Bahnstrecke Etzwilen–Singen

Service
- Route number: 819 / 4320

Technical
- Track gauge: 1,435 mm (4 ft 8 1/2 in)
- Maximum incline: 13 ‰

The Etzwilen to Singen railway is a heritage railway between Etzwilen in the Swiss canton of Thurgau and Singen in the German state of Baden-Württemberg, crossing the eastern part of the canton of Schaffhausen. Passenger train services existed between 1875 and 1969, while cargo trains operated the line until 2004. Today, it is used by heritage trains and draisines.

== History ==
The Etzwilen–Singen railway line was built by the Schweizerische Nationalbahn (SNB) and opened on 17 July 1875, on the same day as the Lake Line sections between Etzwilen and Konstanz and between Kreuzlingen and Kreuzlingen Hafen and the Winterthur–Etzwilen railway line between Etzwilen and Winterthur. The SNB went bankrupt in 1878, and the Etzwilen–Singen railway was subsequently operated by the Schweizerische Nordostbahn (NOB). In 1902, the NOB was subsumed into the Swiss Federal Railways (SBB CFF FFS), which continued passenger train services on the line until 31 May 1969. The line was used for the rolling highway between Lugano and Singen. In 1996, these operations were shortened to Rielasingen and on 12 December 2004, freight train services ceased on the entire Etzwilen–Singen railway line. Some of the reasons for the termination were the limited strength of the Hemishofen railway bridge and the fact that the line had never been electrified. In fact, when it closed in 2004, it was the only railway line of Swiss Federal Railways that was not electrified.

The route section between Singen and Rielasingen was for several years inoperable because part of the railway track had been removed during the construction of a roundabout in Singen. The missing section was rebuilt in 2019 and the railway line reopened to heritage train services on 16 August 2020.

== Current use ==
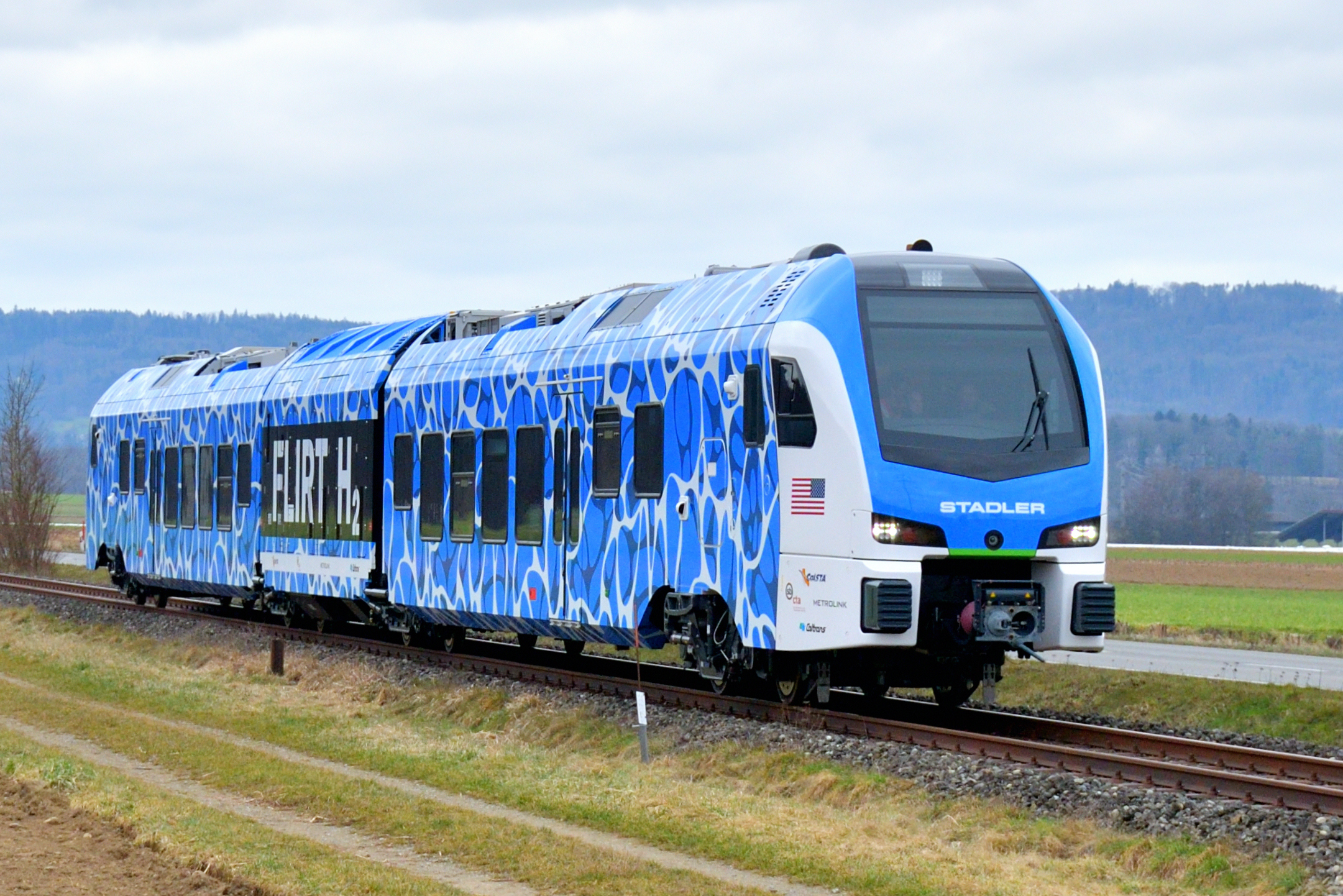
Hydrogen train testing near Ramsen

Since 1 August 2007, the section between Etzwilen and Ramsen is a heritage railway. On 28 May 2011, operations were extended northwards to Rielasingen, and since 16 August 2020 the entire line is operable again. Heritage trains are operated by the foundation Museumsbahn SEHR & RS (short for Stein am Rhein – Etzwilen – Hemishofen – Ramsen & Rielasingen – Singen), which was founded on 27 January 2006. One of the co-founders is Giorgio Behr. Heritage trains pulled by steam locomotives operate on specific dates or otherwise on request.

Except for the dates on which heritage trains operate, the route section between Etzwilen and Ramsen is open to the use of draisines on Sundays and Swiss holidays from April to October. Each draisine carries two to five people.

Between December 2022 and June 2023, Stadler Rail tested hydrogen trains for Arrow on the Etzwilen–Singen railway line.

There are currently no concrete plans to use the Etzwilen–Singen railway for scheduled passenger trains in the near future. Service to the towns along the line was replaced by bus route 33 / 7349 of Südbadenbus

== Route and infrastructure ==
The Etzwilen–Singen railway is 13.29 km (8.26 mi) long and connects five railway stations: Etzwilen, Hemishofen, Ramsen, Arlen-Rielasingen and Singen (Hohentwiel). Hemishofen, Ramsen and Rielasingen stations are served by heritage trains only. Etzwilen station is served by the S1 of St. Gallen S-Bahn and the S29 of Zürich S-Bahn, and Singen station by the Seehas (S6) and Rhyhas (S62) named trains and InterCity (IC) and InterRegio-Express (IRE) services.

The route runs from Etzwilen in the canton of Thurgau, Switzerland, to Singen in Baden-Württemberg, Germany, passing through the eastern part of the canton of Schaffhausen. Between Ramsen and Rielasingen-Worblingen, it crosses the border between Switzerland and Germany. The line includes nine bridges, the most notable one being the Hemishofen bridge over the Rhine. During the cold season, members of Museumsbahn SEHR & RS perform maintenance work on the railway infrastructure and the rolling stock.

== Gallery ==
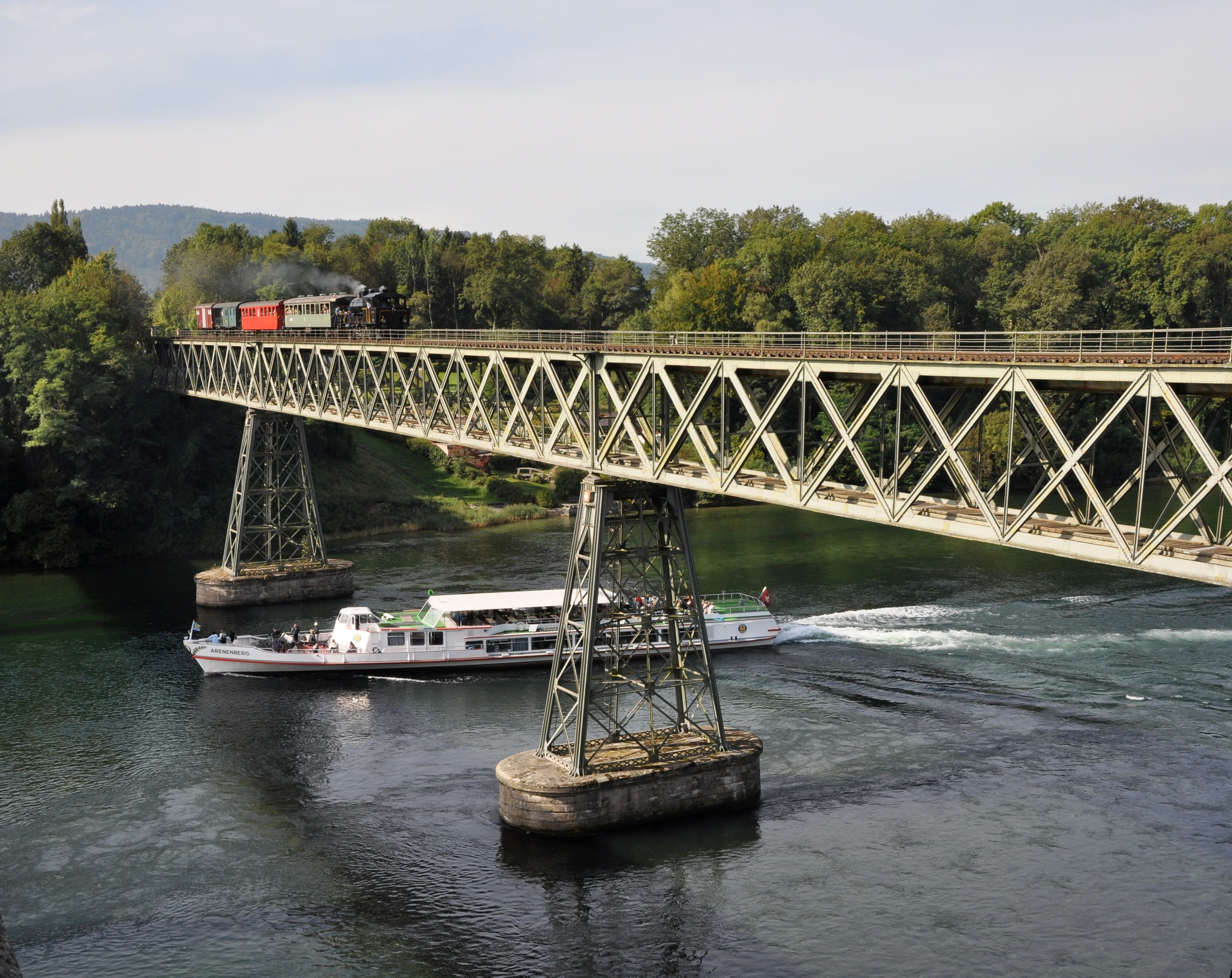
Heritage train on the Hemishofen railway bridge over the River Rhine

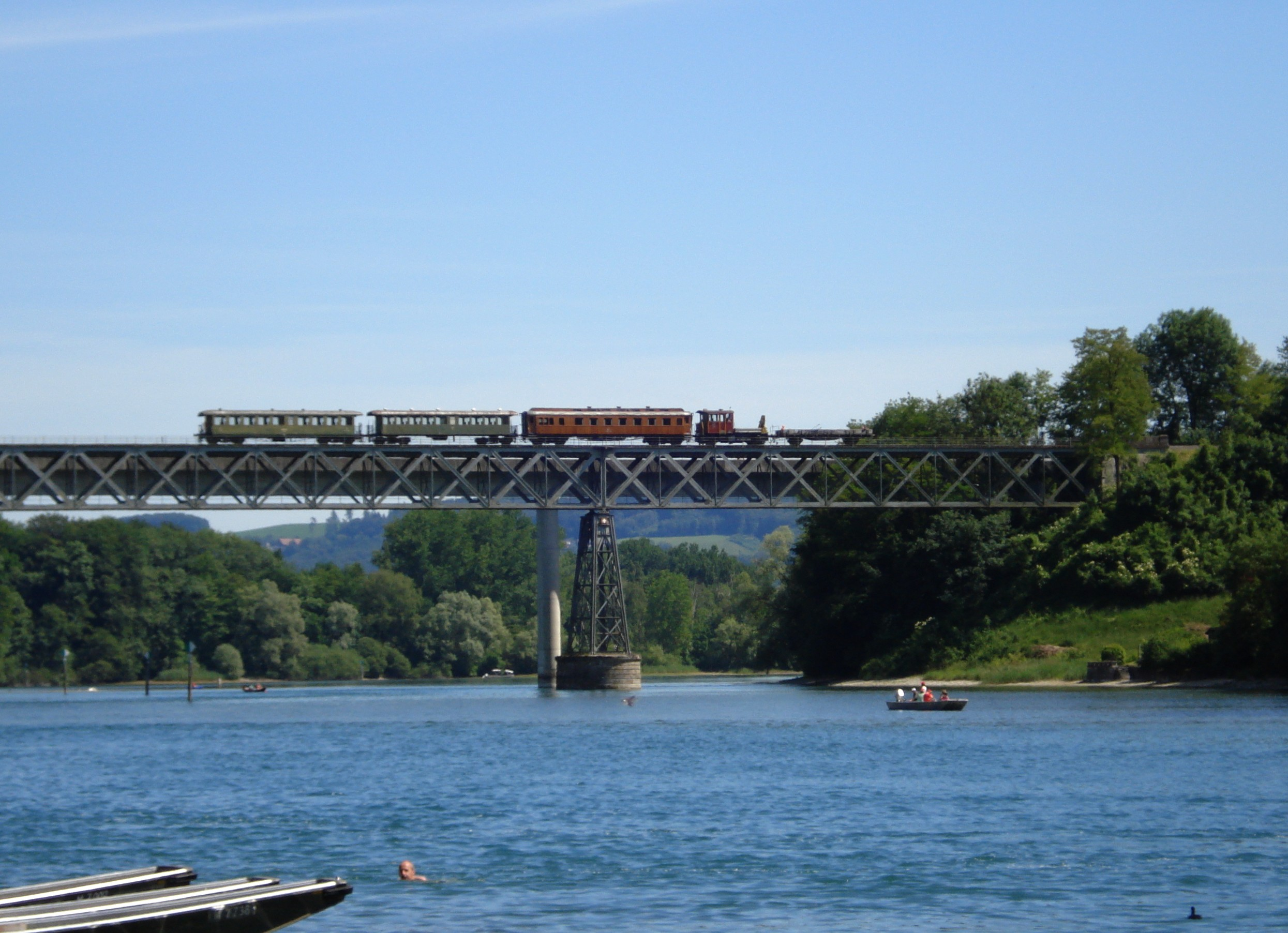
Heritage train on the Hemishofen railway bridge over the River Rhine

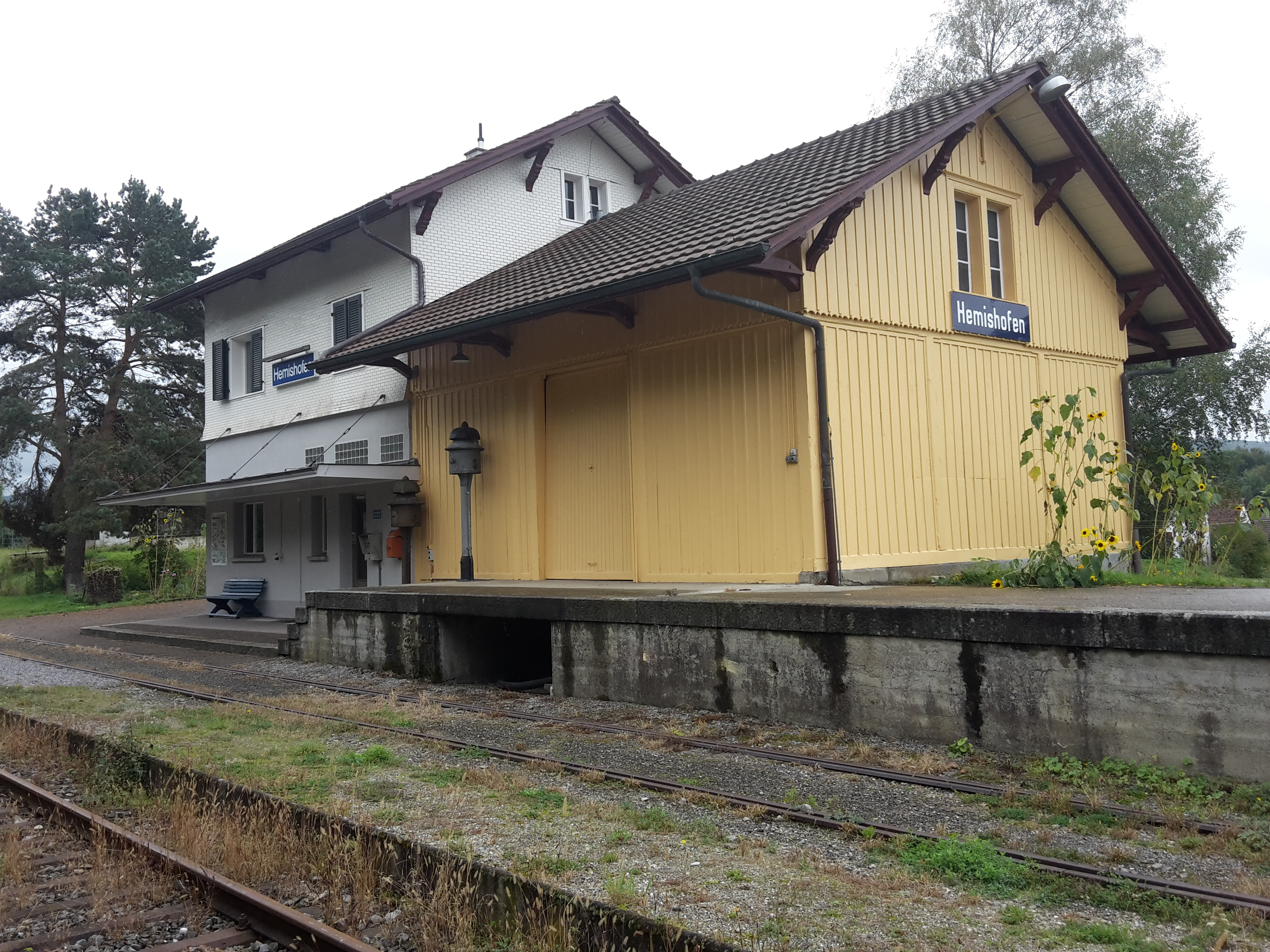
Hemishofen railway station

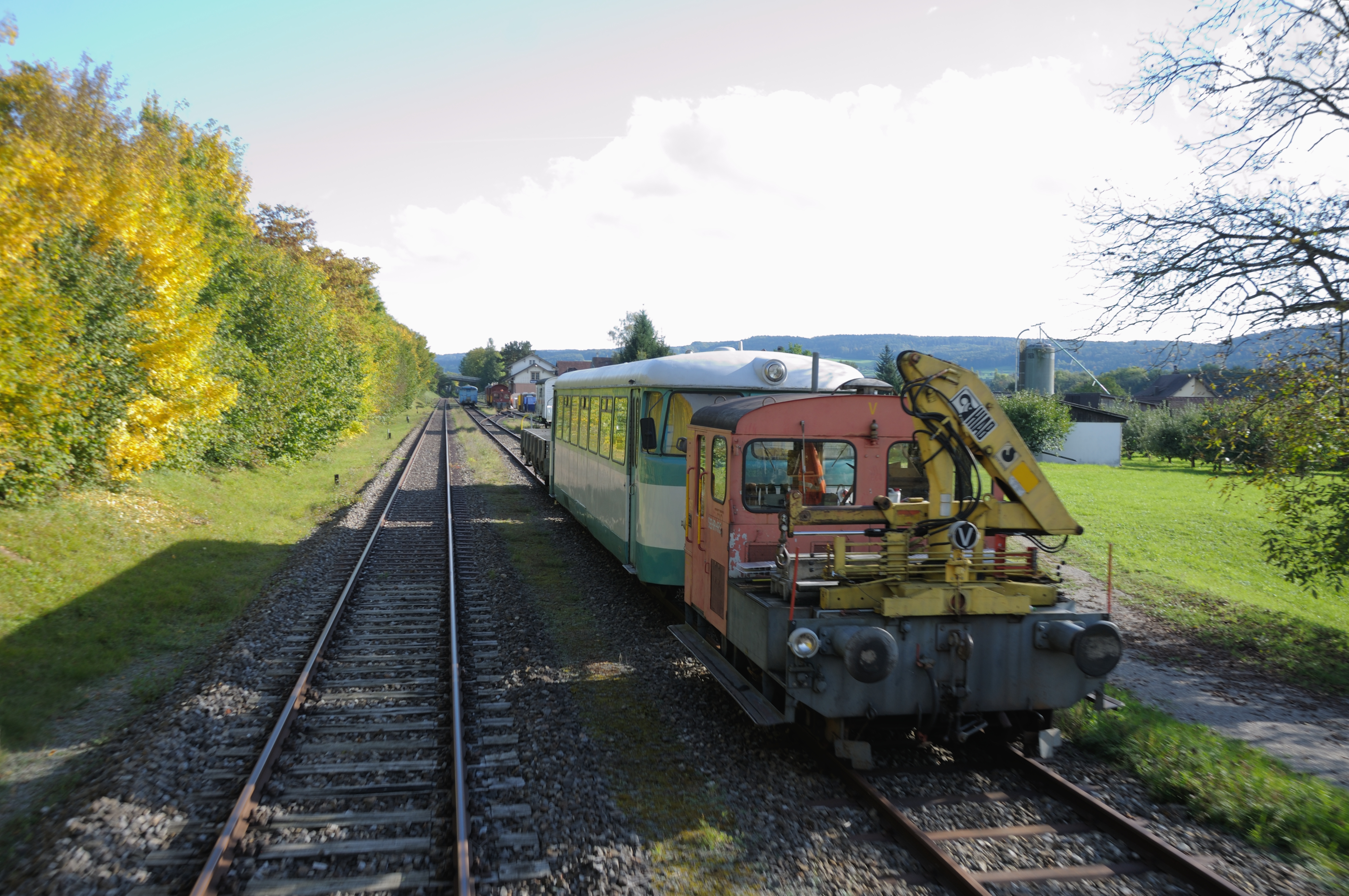
Route section near Hemishofen in 2013

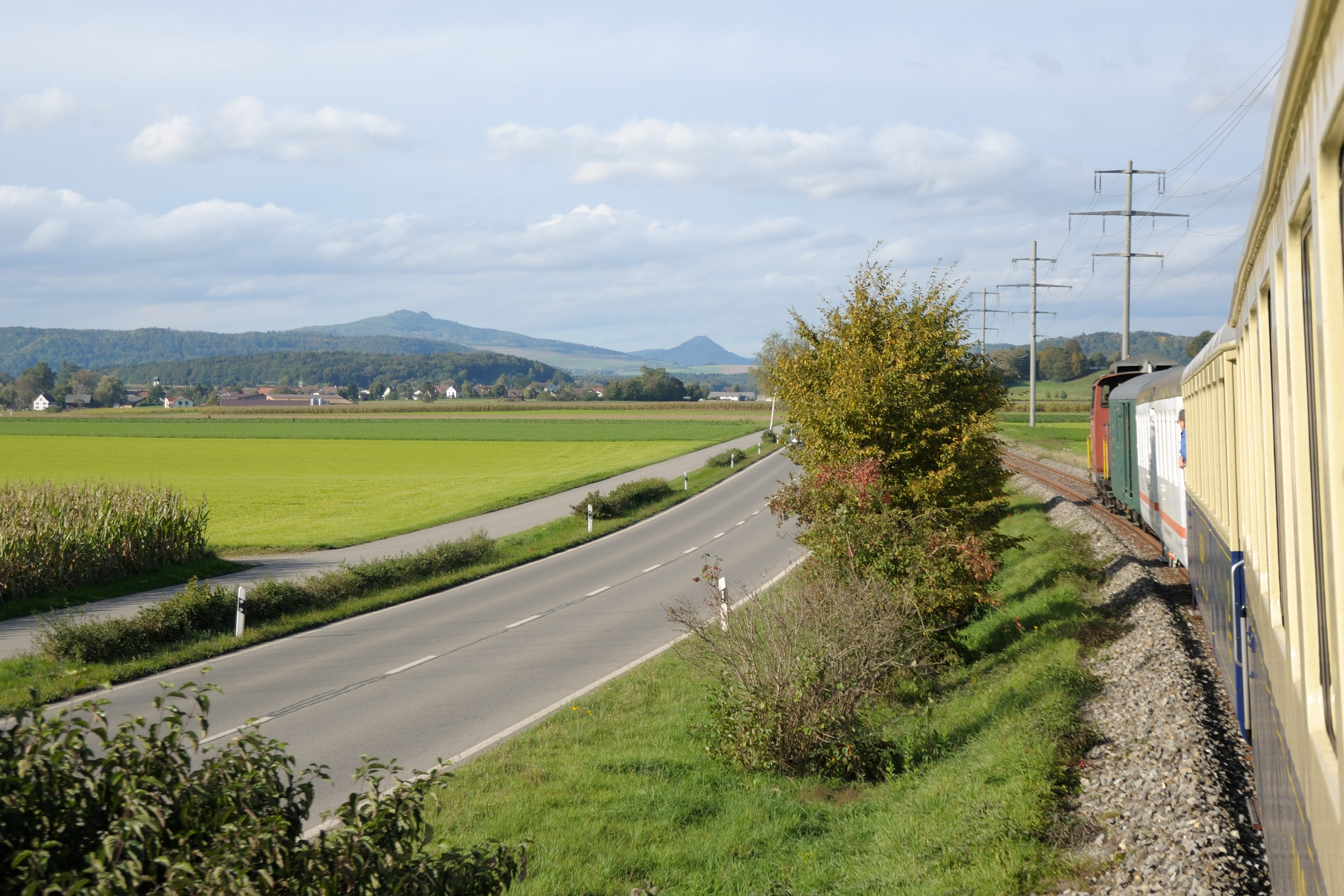
Route between Hemishofen and Ramsen, view over extinct Hegau volcanoes

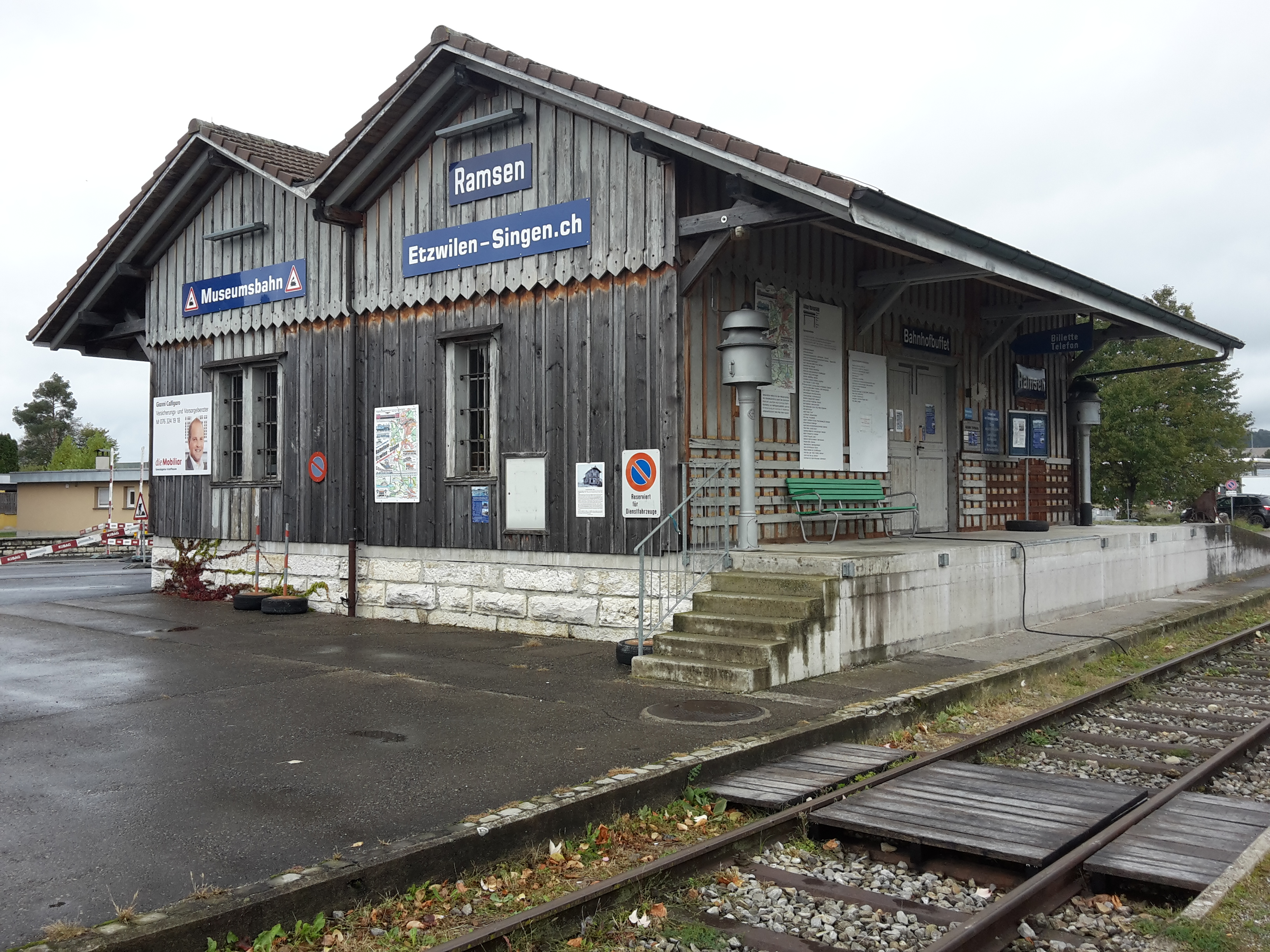
Ramsen railway station

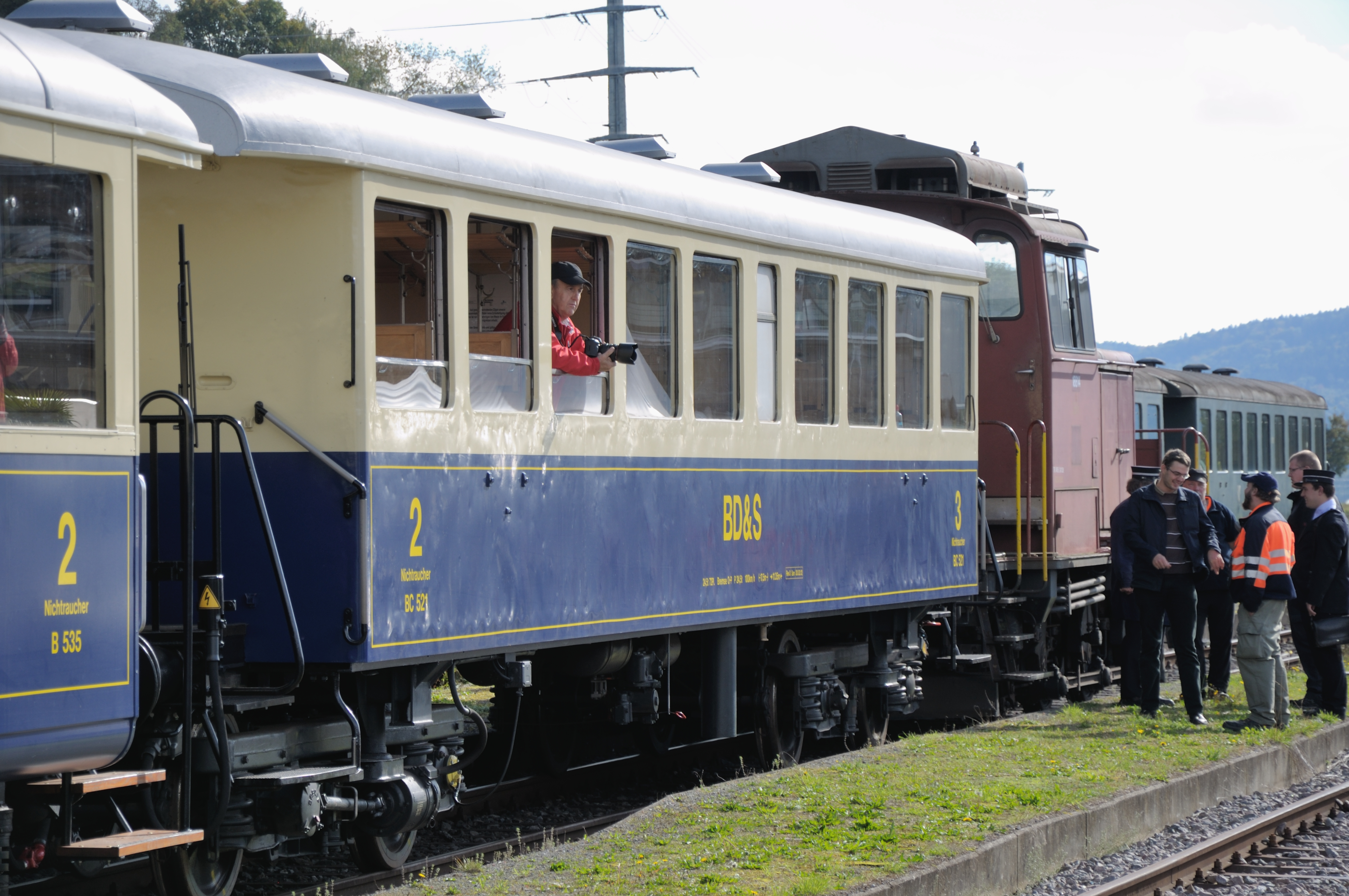
Heritage train at Ramsen station

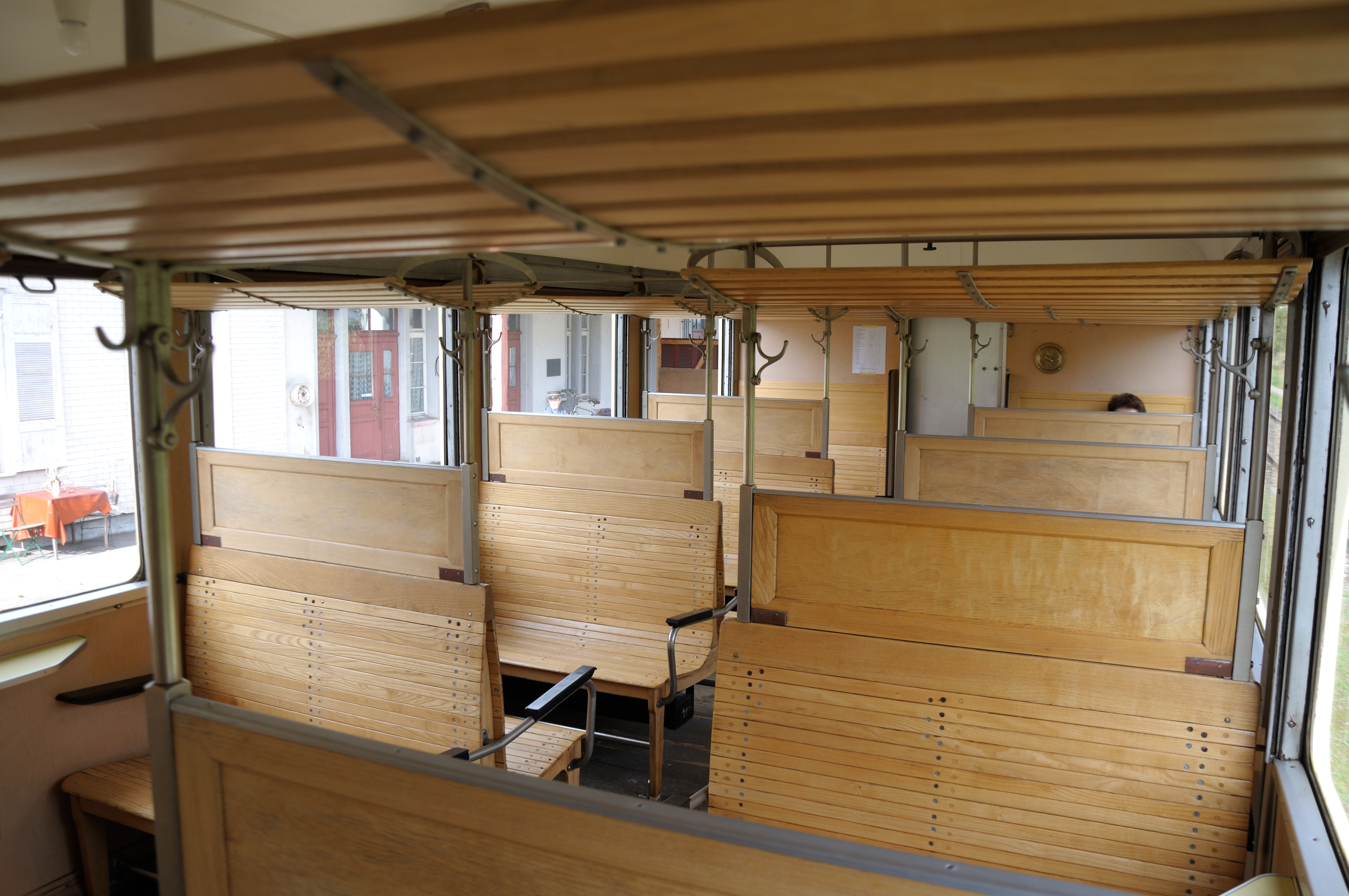
Interior of heritage coach

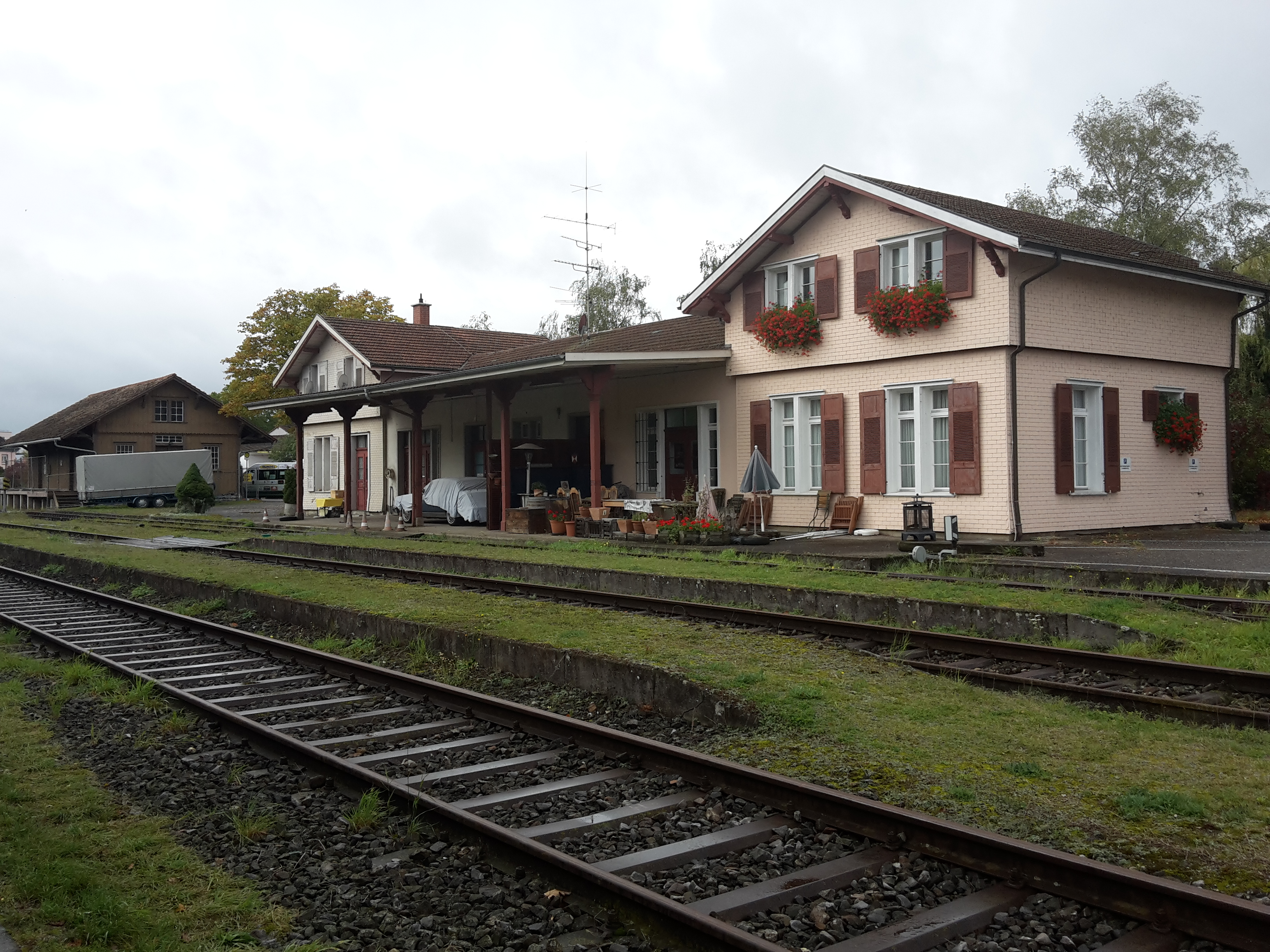
Arlen-Rielasingen railway station

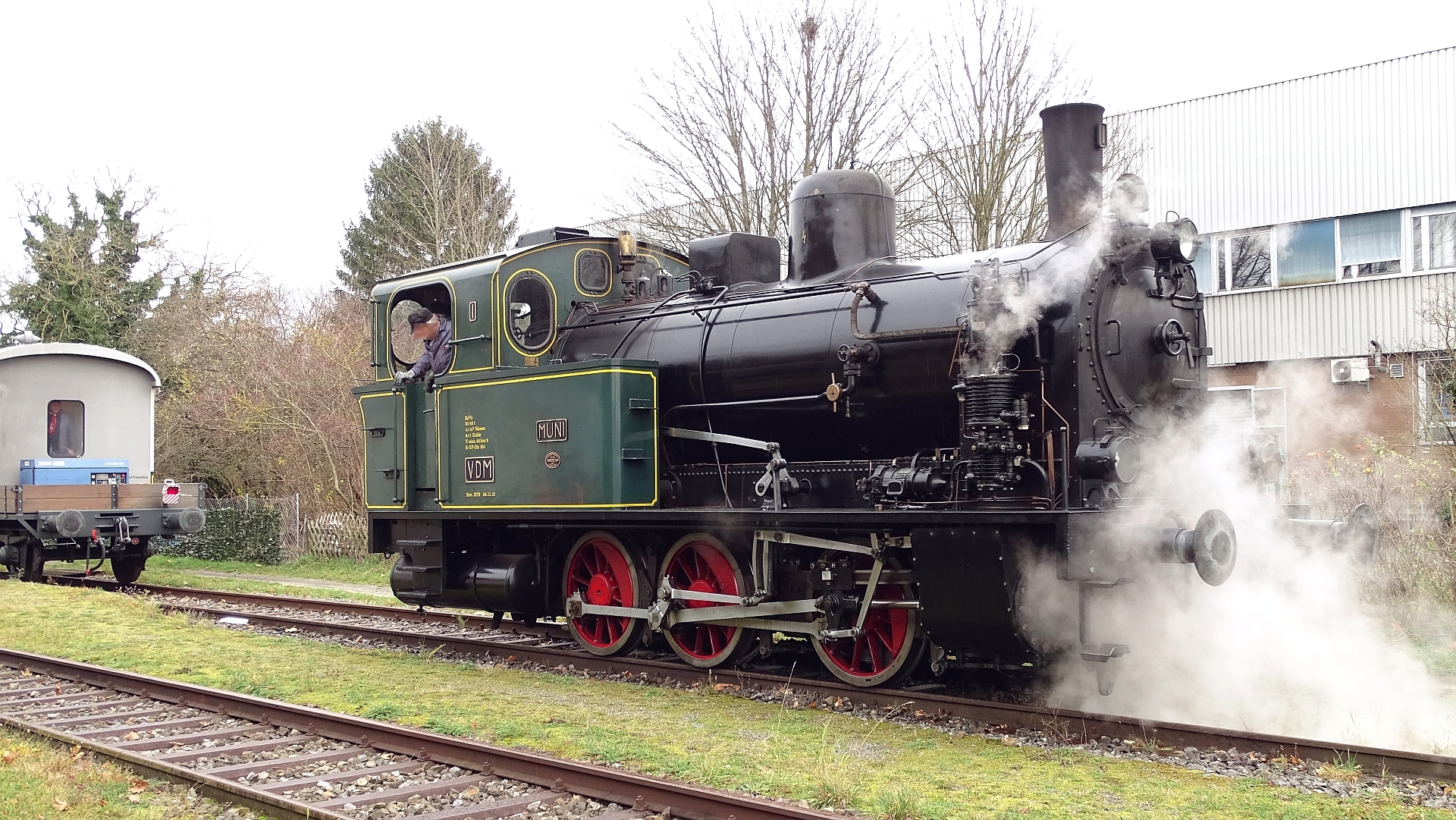
RBW 327 locomotive in Rielasingen

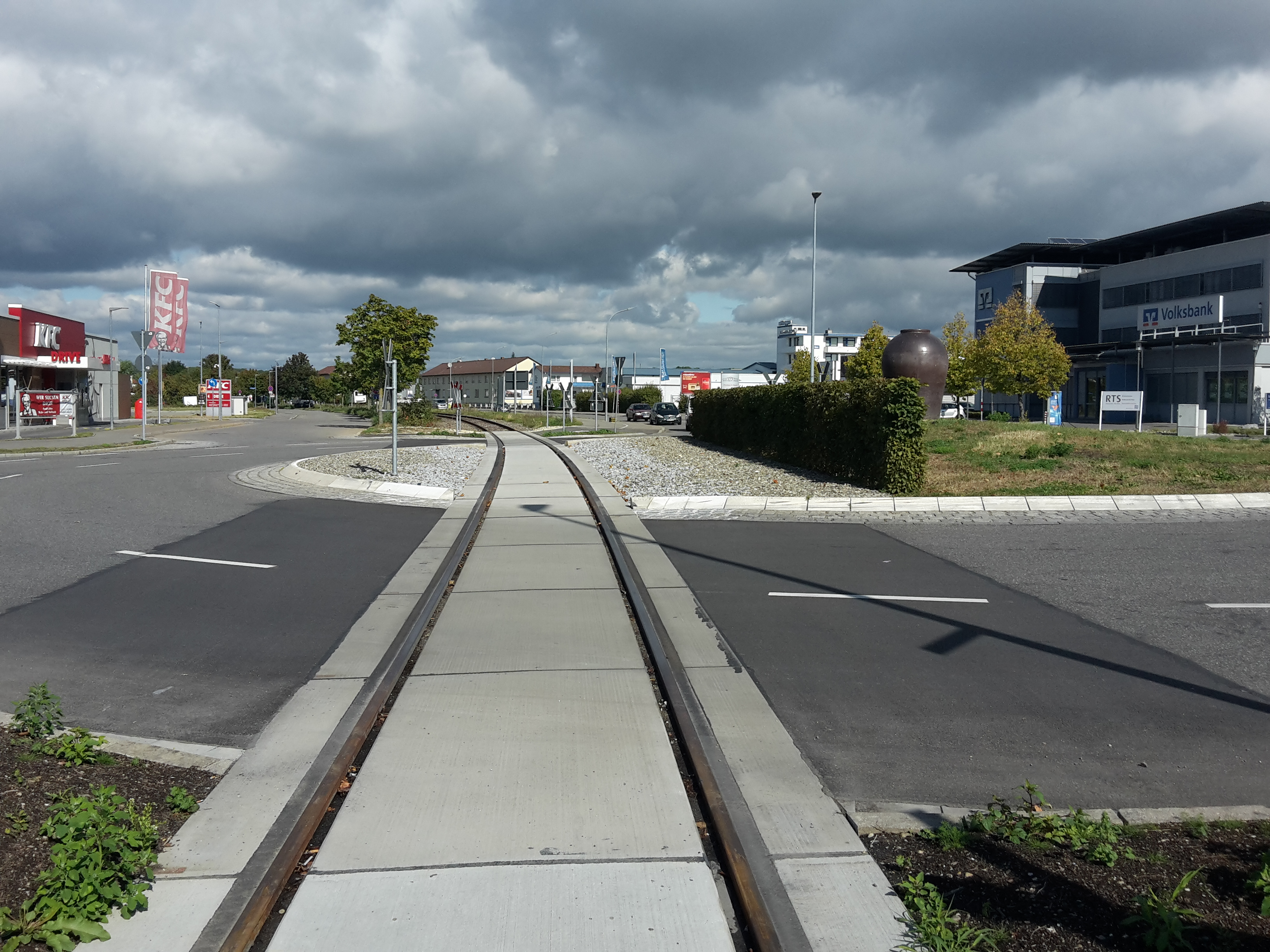
Restored tracks at the roundabout in Singen

== See also ==
- List of heritage railways in Switzerland
- List of heritage railways in Germany
