= Ramsen railway station =

Railway station in Switzerland

Ramsen
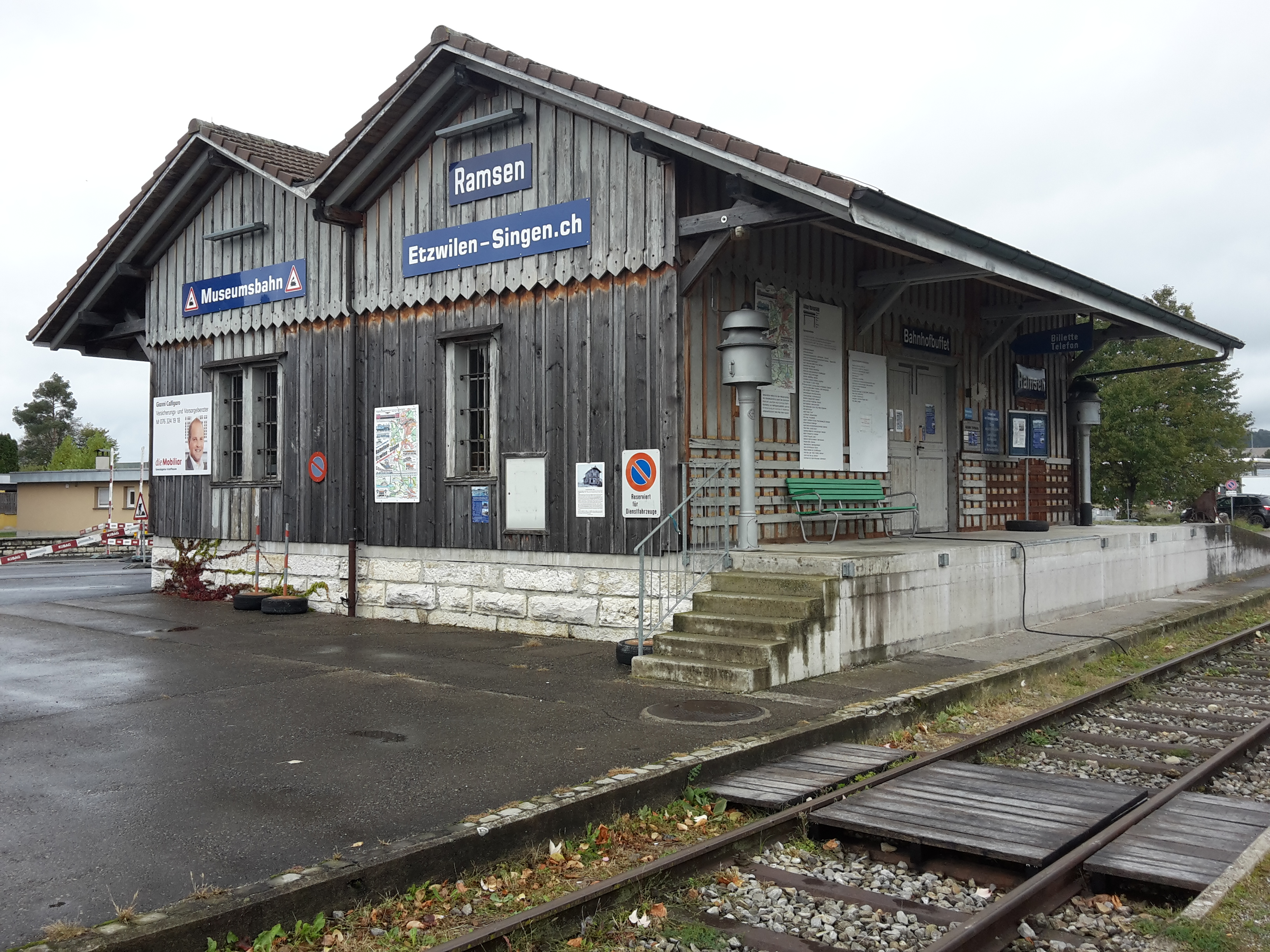
- The station building in 2019

General information
- Other names: Bahnhof Ramsen
- Location: Petersburg 560, Ramsen; Switzerland
- Coordinates: 47°42′28″N 8°49′16″E
- Elevation: 413 m (1,355 ft)
- Operator: Museumsbahn SEHR & RS
- Line: Etzwilen–Singen railway
- Platforms: 1
- Tracks: 3 (German: Gleis)

Construction
- Structure type: at-grade
- Platform levels: 1
Location
- Location within Switzerland Location within Canton of Schaffhausen

Ramsen railway station (German: Bahnhof Ramsen) is a railway station in the municipality of Ramsen in the eastern part of the canton of Schaffhausen, Switzerland, situated at the border with Germany. It is located between Hemishofen and Arlen-Rielasingen on the Etzwilen–Singen railway line, which closed to scheduled passenger train services in 1969. Since 2007, heritage trains call at the station on weekends during the warm season.
