= Lancrans =

Part of Valserhône in Auvergne-Rhône-Alpes, France

Lancrans Lancrens (Arpitan)
- Part of Valserhône
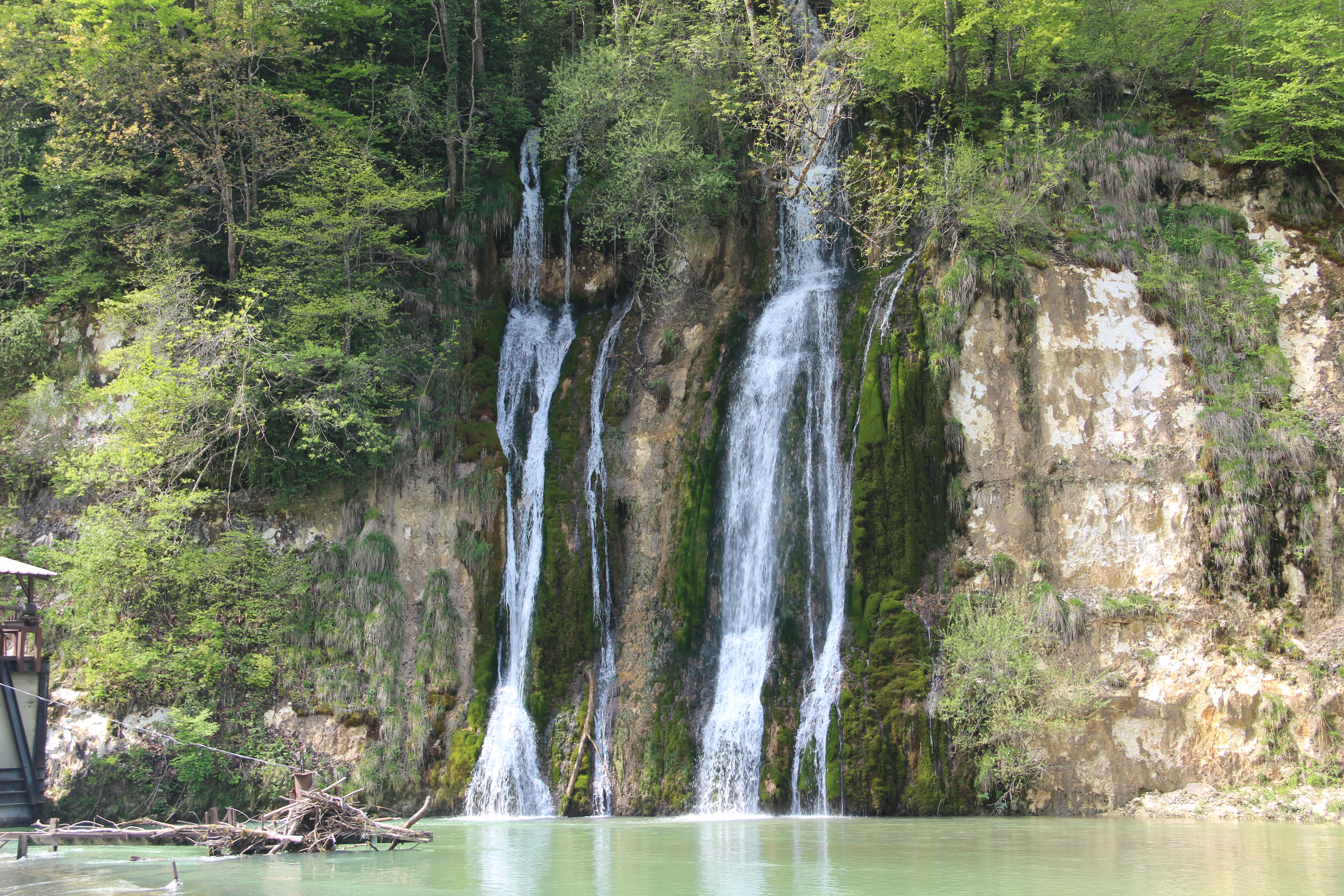
- Waterfall in Lancrans
- Location of Lancrans
- Location within France Location within Auvergne-Rhône-Alpes
- Coordinates: 46°07′30″N 5°50′03″E
- Country: France
- Region: Auvergne-Rhône-Alpes
- Department: Ain
- Arrondissement: Nantua
- Canton: Bellegarde-sur-Valserine
- Commune: Valserhône
- Area^{1}: 9.66 km^{2} (3.73 sq mi)
- Elevation: 625 m (2,051 ft)
- Highest elevation: 1,606 m (5,269 ft)
- Lowest elevation: 350 m (1,150 ft)
- Population (2022): 1,074
  - Density: 111/km^{2} (288/sq mi)
- Time zone: UTC+01:00 (CET)
  - Summer (DST): UTC+02:00 (CEST)
- Postal code: 01200
- ^{1} French Land Register data, which excludes lakes, ponds, glaciers > 1 km^{2} (0.386 sq mi or 247 acres) and river estuaries.

Lancrans (French pronunciation: [lɑ̃kʁɑ̃]; Arpitan: Lancrens) is a former commune in the Ain department in the Auvergne-Rhône-Alpes region in Eastern France. On 1 January 2019, it was merged into the new commune of Valserhône. In 1858, Vanchy (renamed Coupy in 1907, merged in 1966 into Bellegarde-sur-Valserine) and Confort separated from Lancrans to form new communes.

== Geography ==
The town of Lancrans is located to the northeast of the Pertes de la Valserine, a small canyon where the Valserine runs partly underground. It used to mark the border with Bellegarde-sur-Valserine. It is similar to the former Perte du Rhône.

== Population ==
Historical population
Year	Pop.	±% p.a.
2007	1,015	—
2012	1,038	+0.45%
2022	1,074	+0.34%
Source: INSEE

== See also ==
- Communes of the Ain department
