= Leo Wehrli =

Swiss geologist, teacher and explorer (1870–1954)

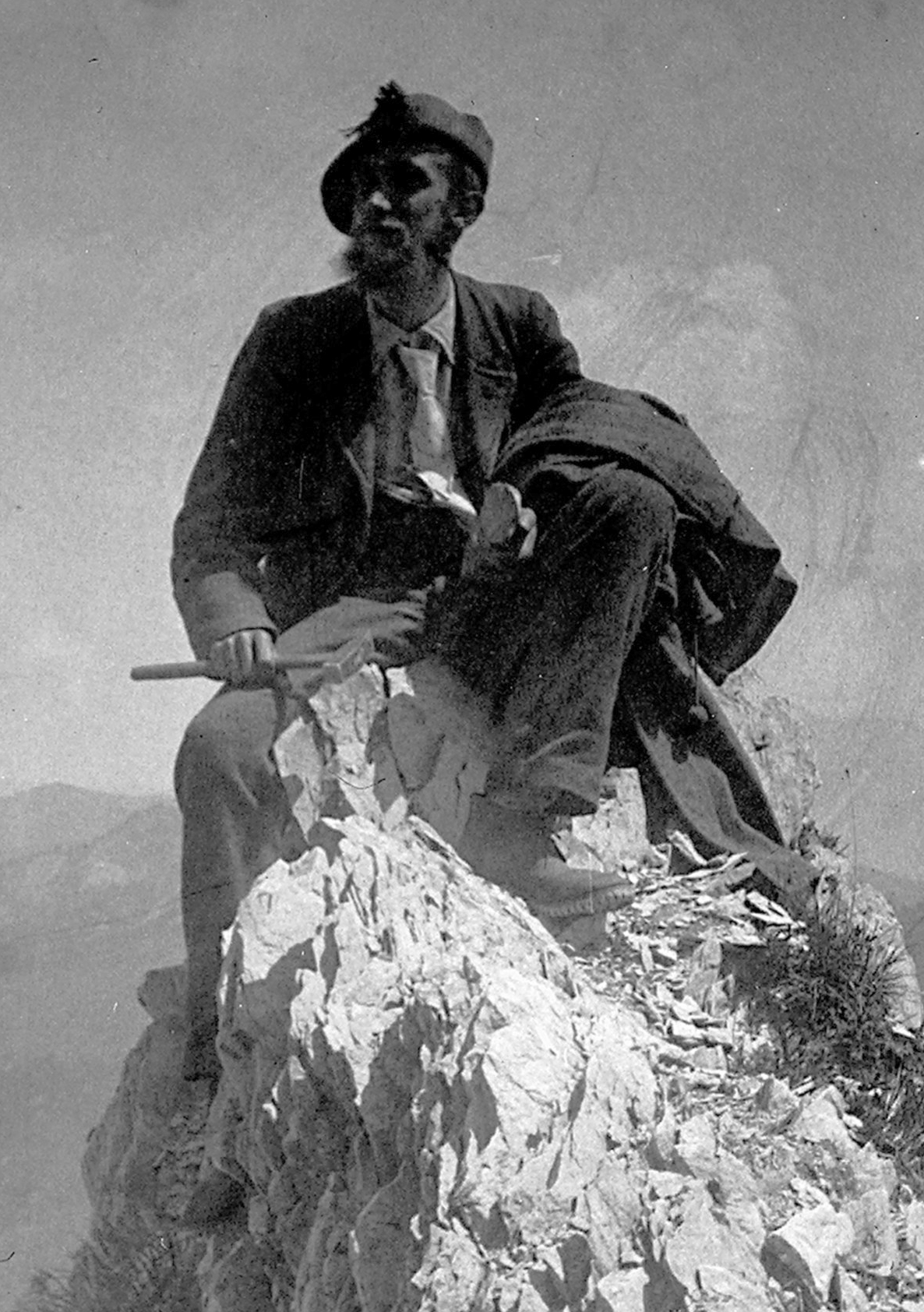
Self portrait by Leo Wehrli on the Mythen Massif (1896)

Leo Wehrli (born February 25, 1870, in Aarau; d. March 28, 1954 in Zurich) was a Swiss geologist, secondary school and continuing education teacher, explorer, and photographer.

Leo Wehrli studied music, botany, chemistry, mineralogy, petrography and geology in Berlin and Zurich and became assistant to Albert Heim. After submitting his dissertation on the Diorite area of Tschlin and Disentis, he went to Argentina with Carl Emanuel Burckhardt in 1896. On behalf of the La Plata Museum and the Argentine government, he explored the Andes and crossed them at least five times during his two-year stay. His work focused on the Argentine-Chilean border adjustment (after generations of conflict, both countries had only signed a Border Treaty in 1881) and the determination of the summit lines and watersheds.

After his return, he worked from 1900 to 1935 as a teacher of geology and chemistry at the Kantonsschule Hohe Promenade in Zurich. His laboratory assistant and right-hand man was Gotthold Laupper (1873–1944), the inventor of the "Laupper probe", which was successfully used to bring the problem of spontaneous haystack fires under control.

As a consultant for the Geologisches Centralblatt in Berlin, Wehrli wrote almost 500 papers between 1901 and 1912. He undertook further journeys through Europe and North Africa as well as to Argentina again in 1938. He summarized his research findings in numerous articles, including for the Geographical Dictionary of Switzerland.

He was involved in the founding of the Züricher Volkshochschule and lectured there from 1921 to 1953. From 1931 to 1951 he was a member of the Swiss Alpine Club SAC commission for the Swiss Alpine Club's Central Library and was its president for 14 years.

Leo Wehrli was married to Anna Margaretha (Grethi), née Frey, and father of Edmund Wehrli. After a short illness, he died on March 28, 1954, at the age of 84. He left behind a collection of 15,000 slides, some of which were colored by hand by his wife. A large part of the works are made available online by the Image Archive of the ETH Library.

== Photos by Leo Wehrli ==
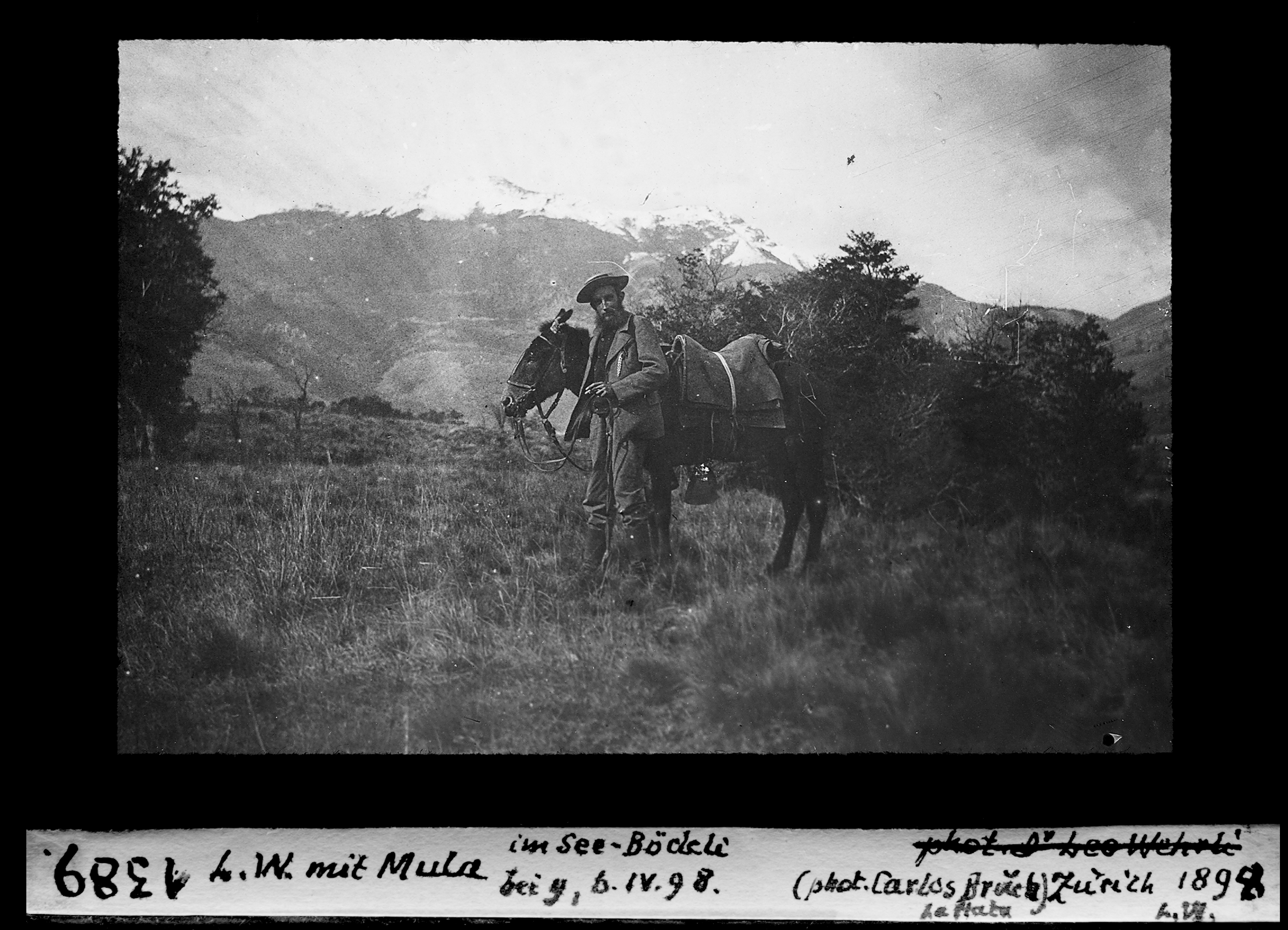
Leo Wehrli with mule, expedition to settle the border (1898)

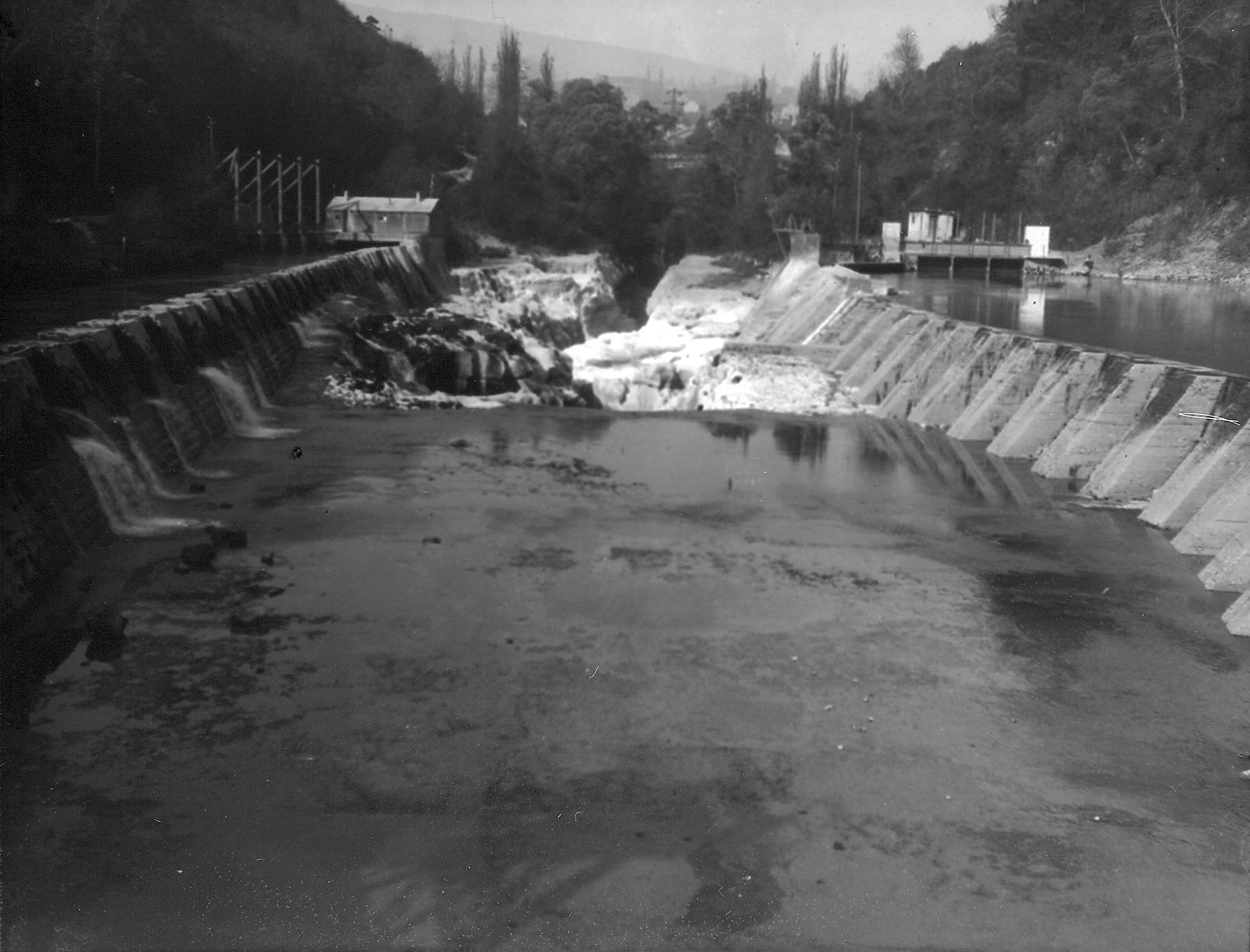
Perte du Rhône before the flooding (1931)

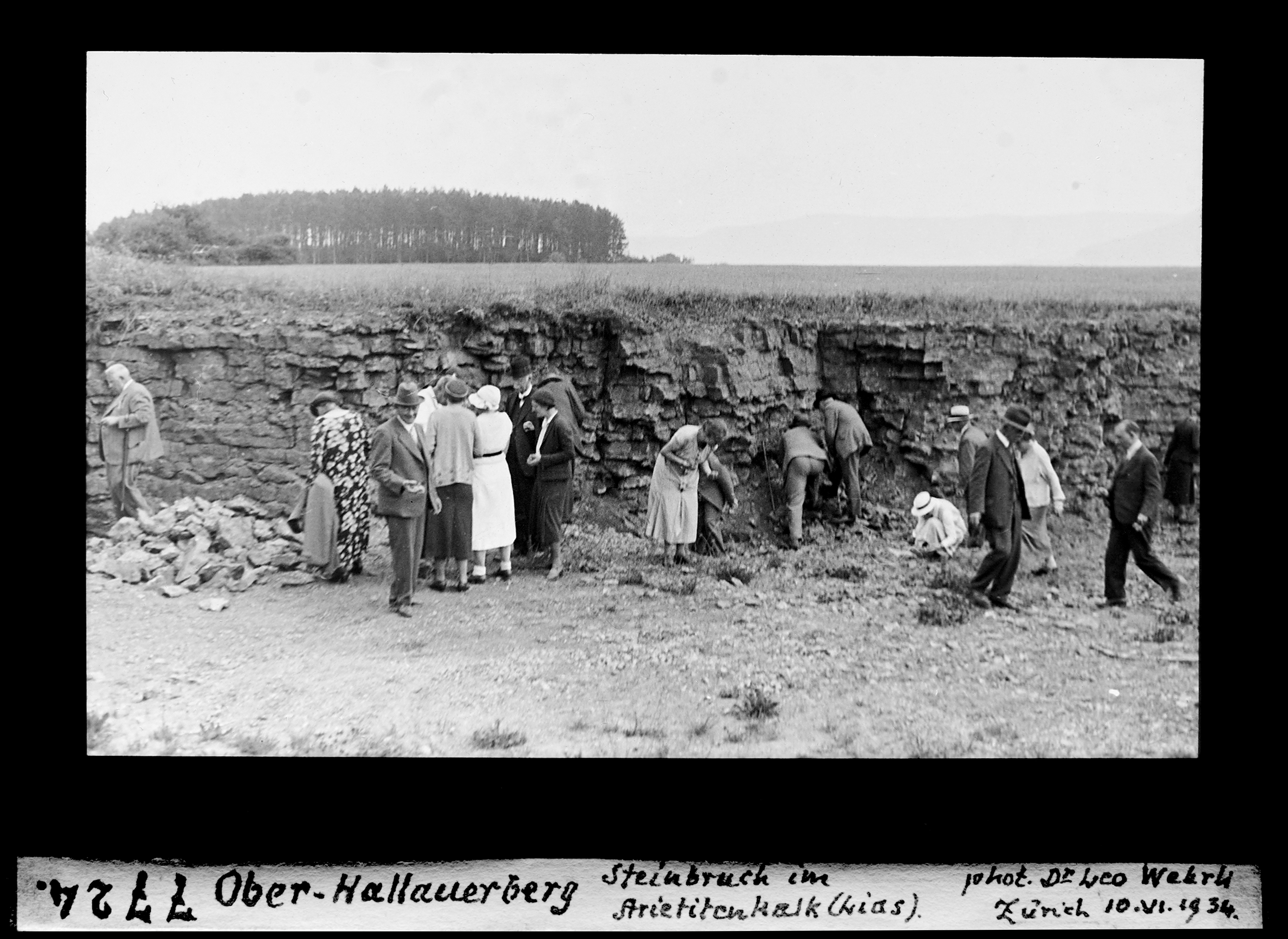
The Volkshochschule Zurich on a fossil excursion in Hallau

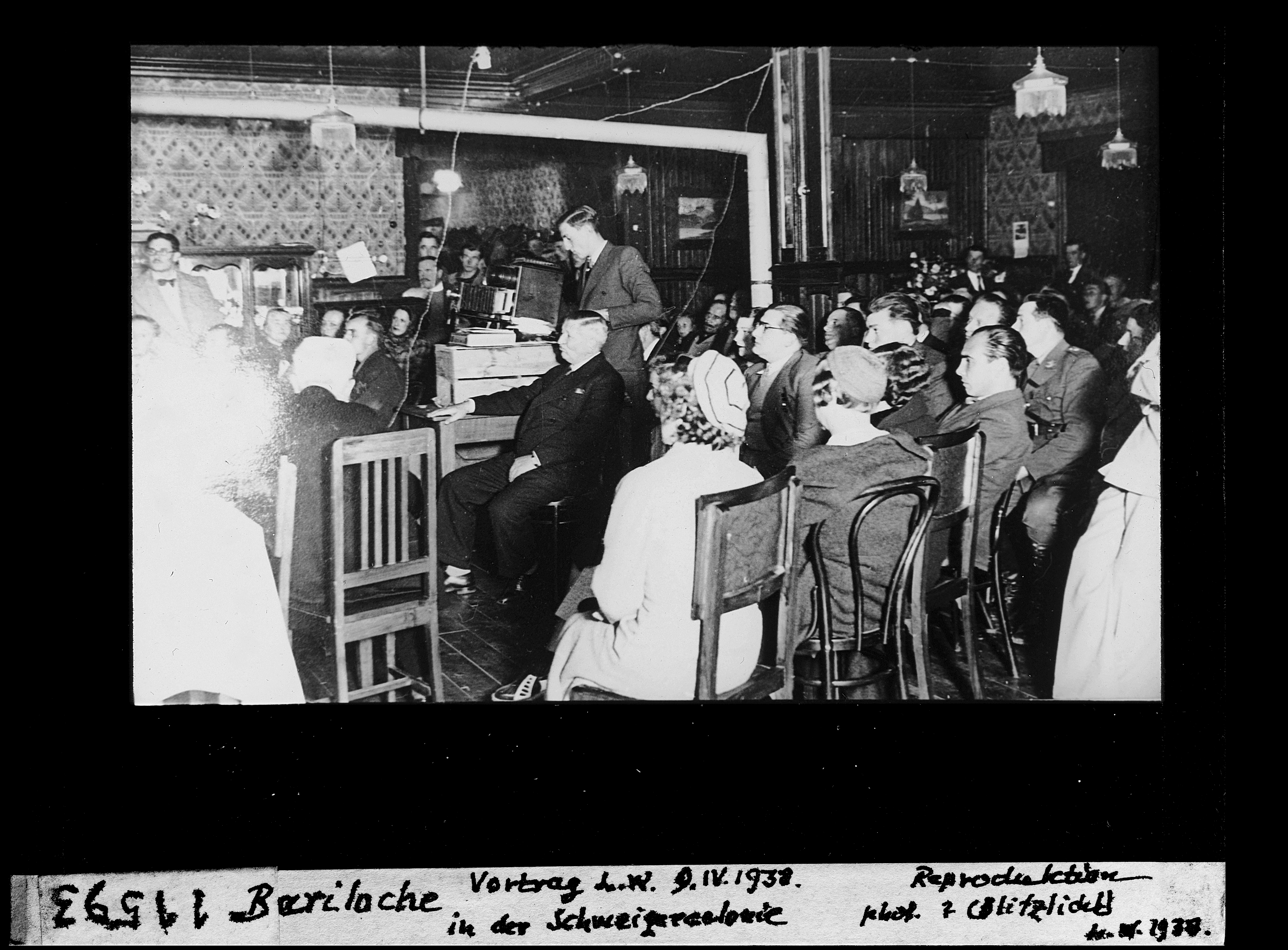
Bariloche, lecture Leo Wehrli in the Schweizercolonie (1938)

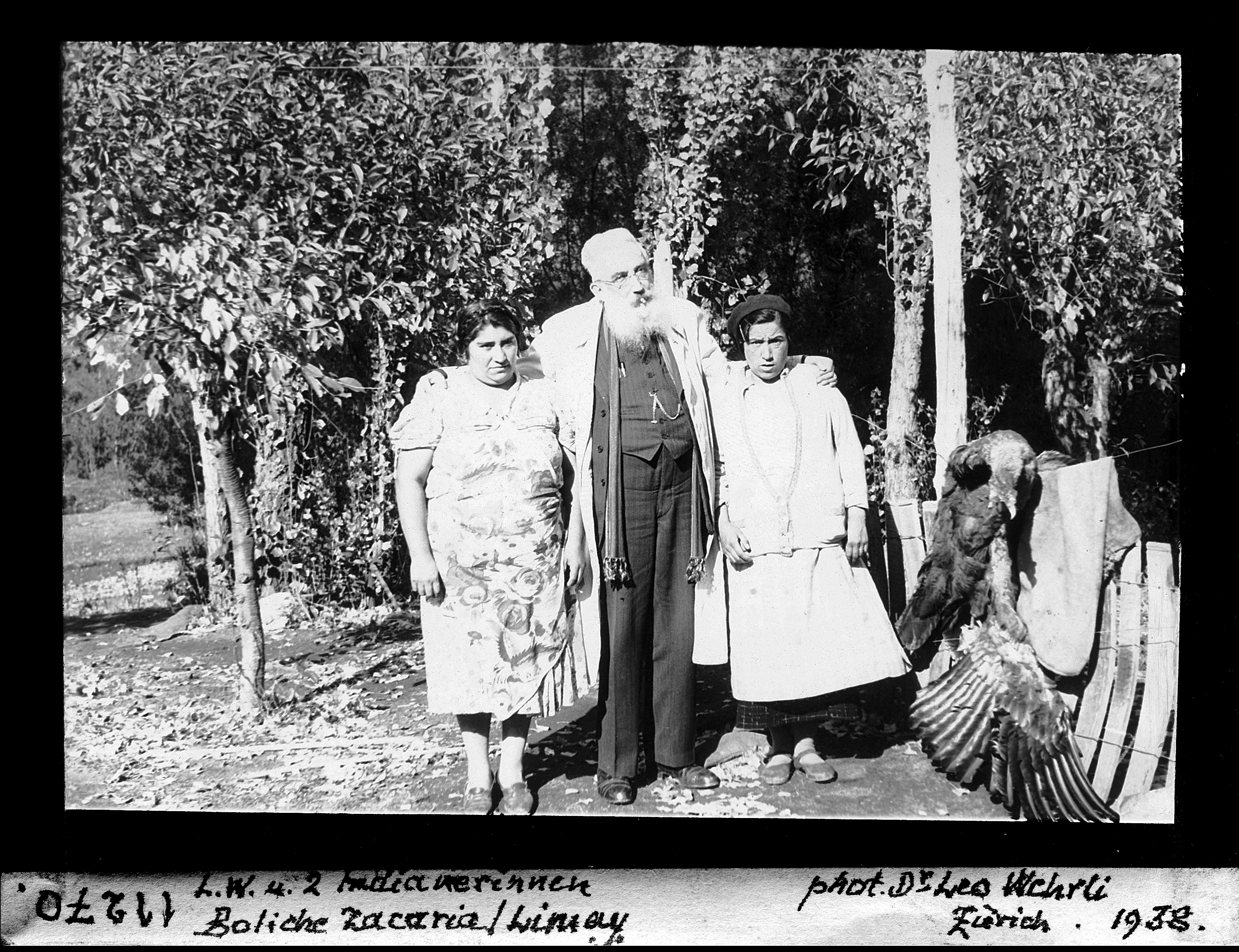
Leo Wehrli and two Indian women, Boliche Zacaria, Limay (1938)

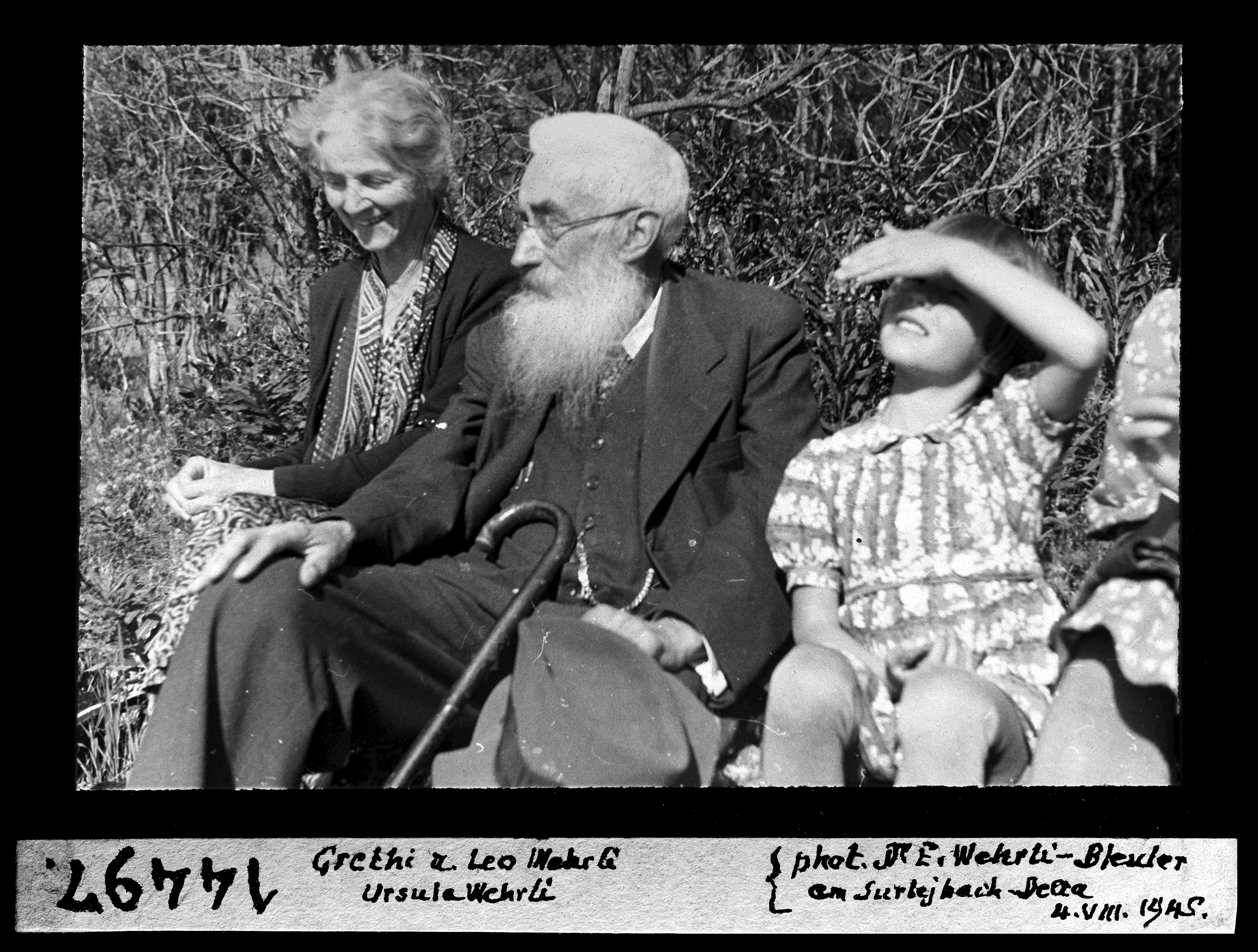
Grethi, Leo and Ursula Wehrli (1945)

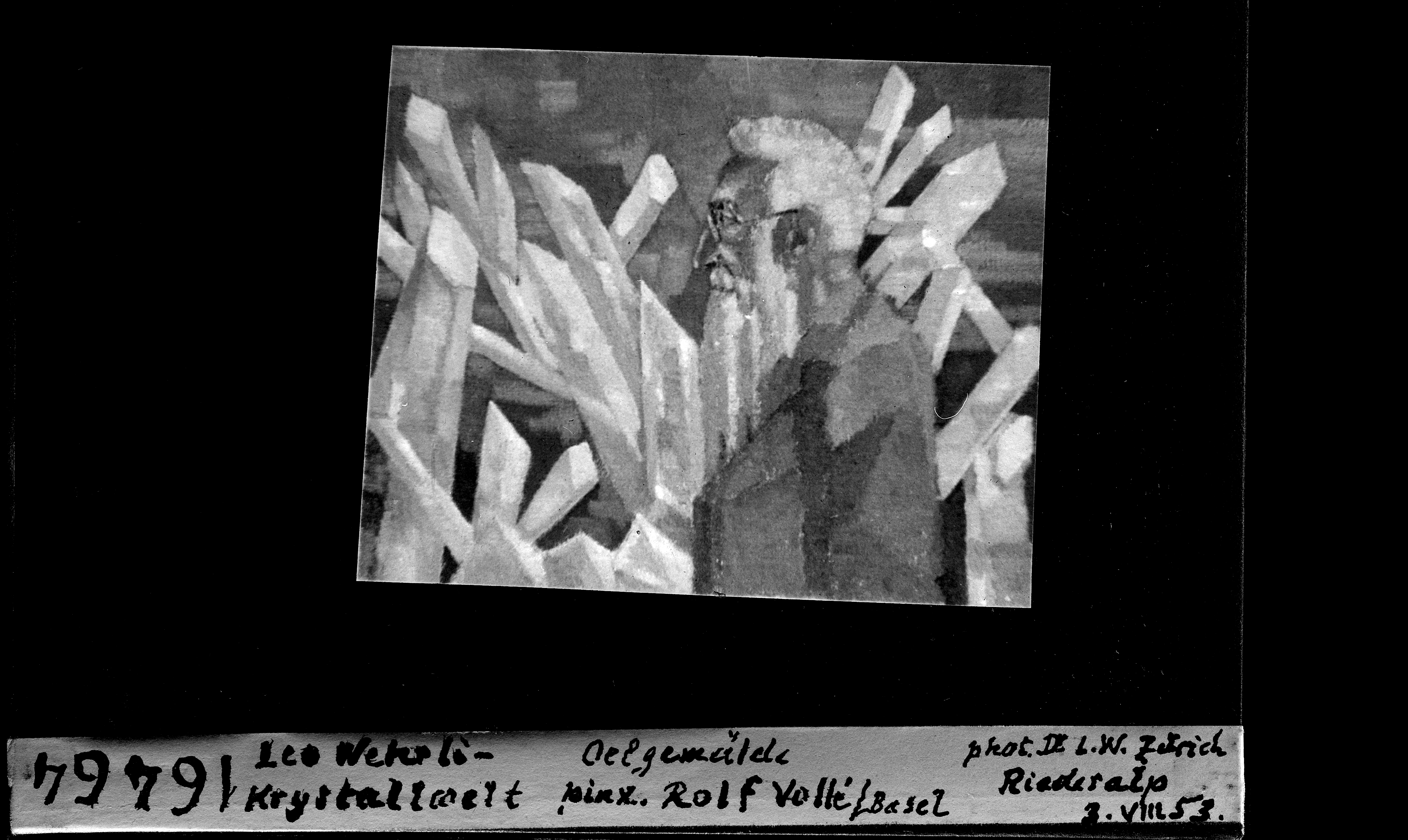
Leo Wehrli, Krystallwelt, Oelgemälde pinx. Rolf Vollé (1953)

== Photos by Leo Wehrli, colorized by M. Wehrli-Frey ==
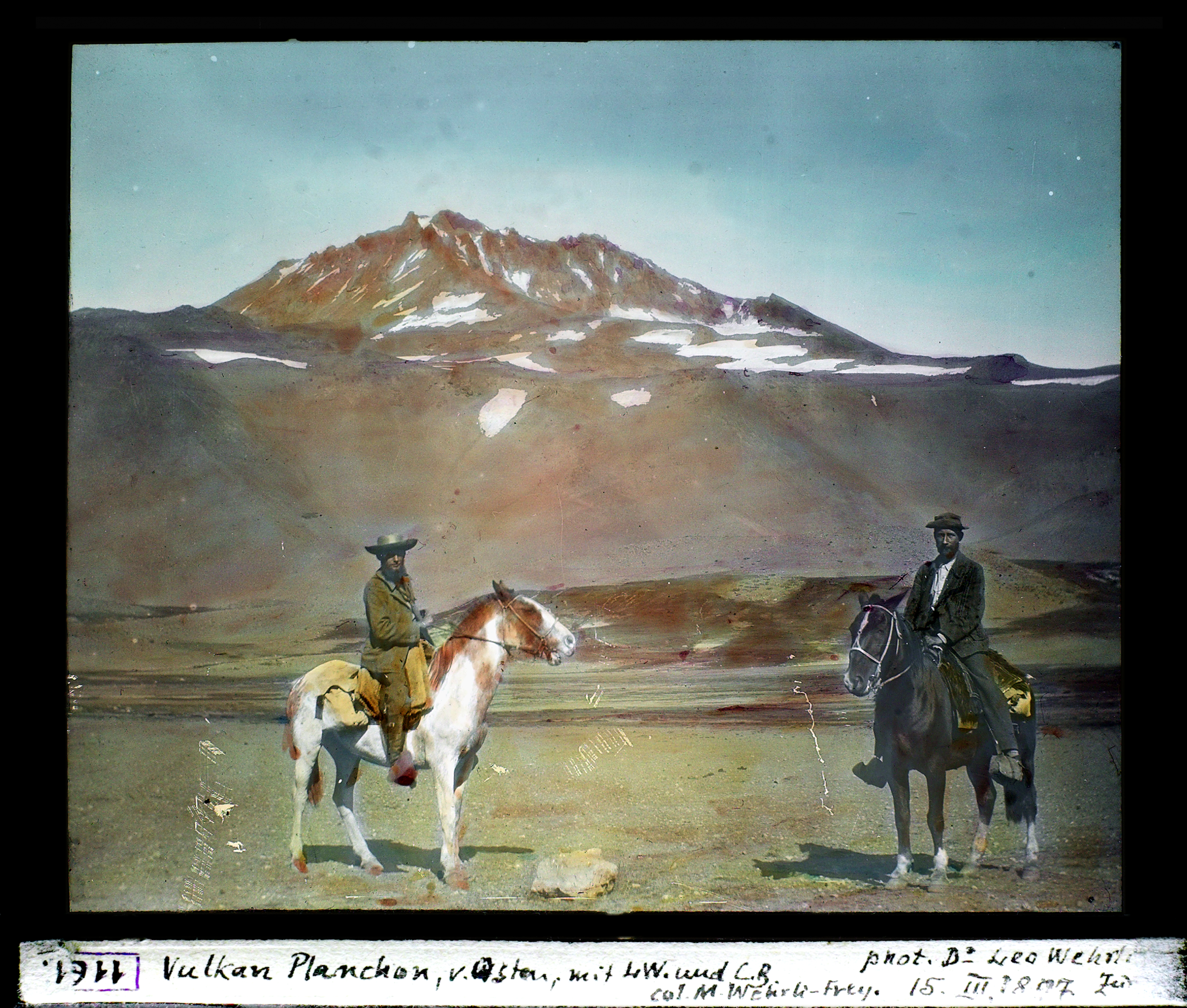
Leo Wehrli and Carlos Bruck in front of the volcano Planchón-Peteroa (1897)

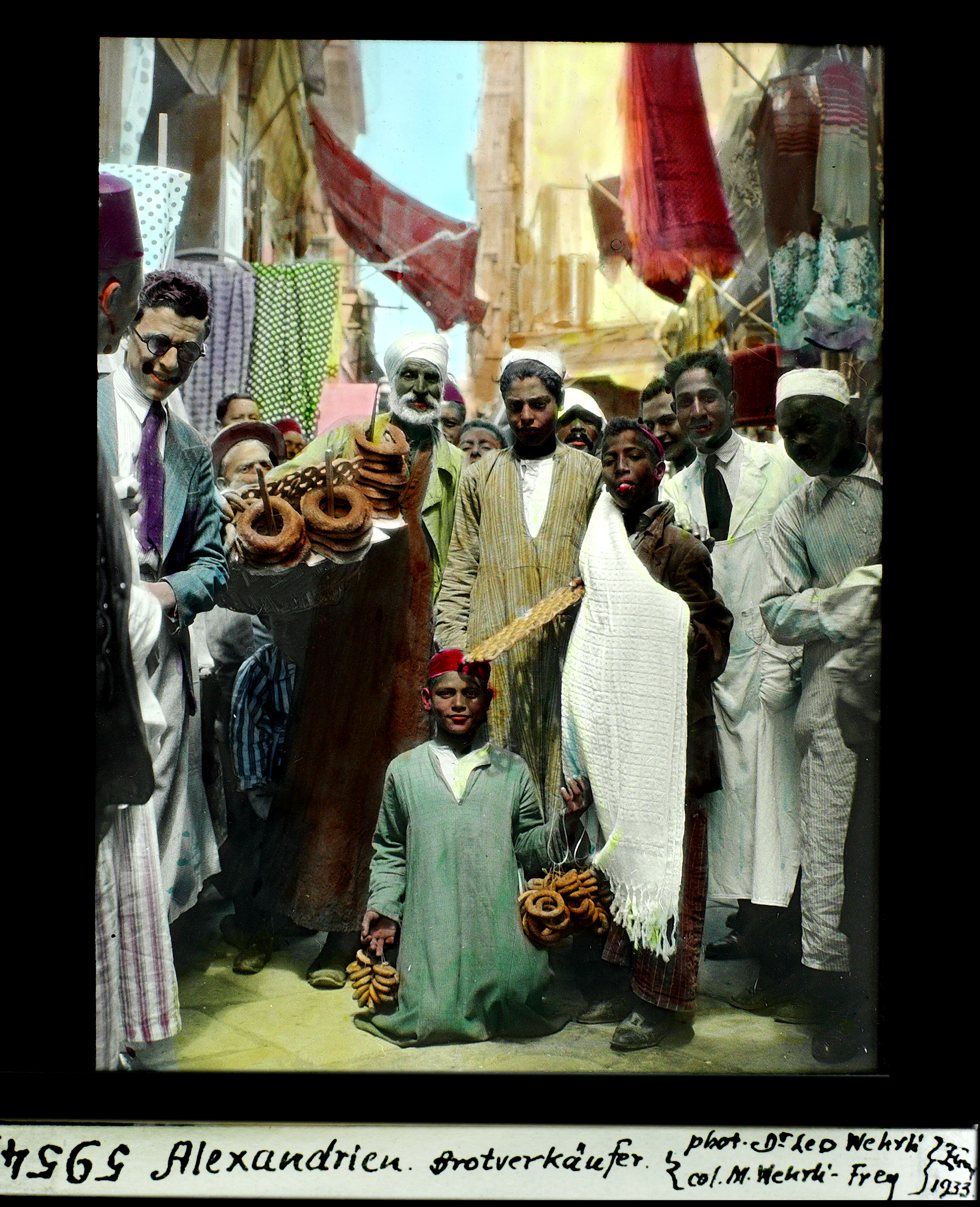
Alexandria, bread vendor (1933)

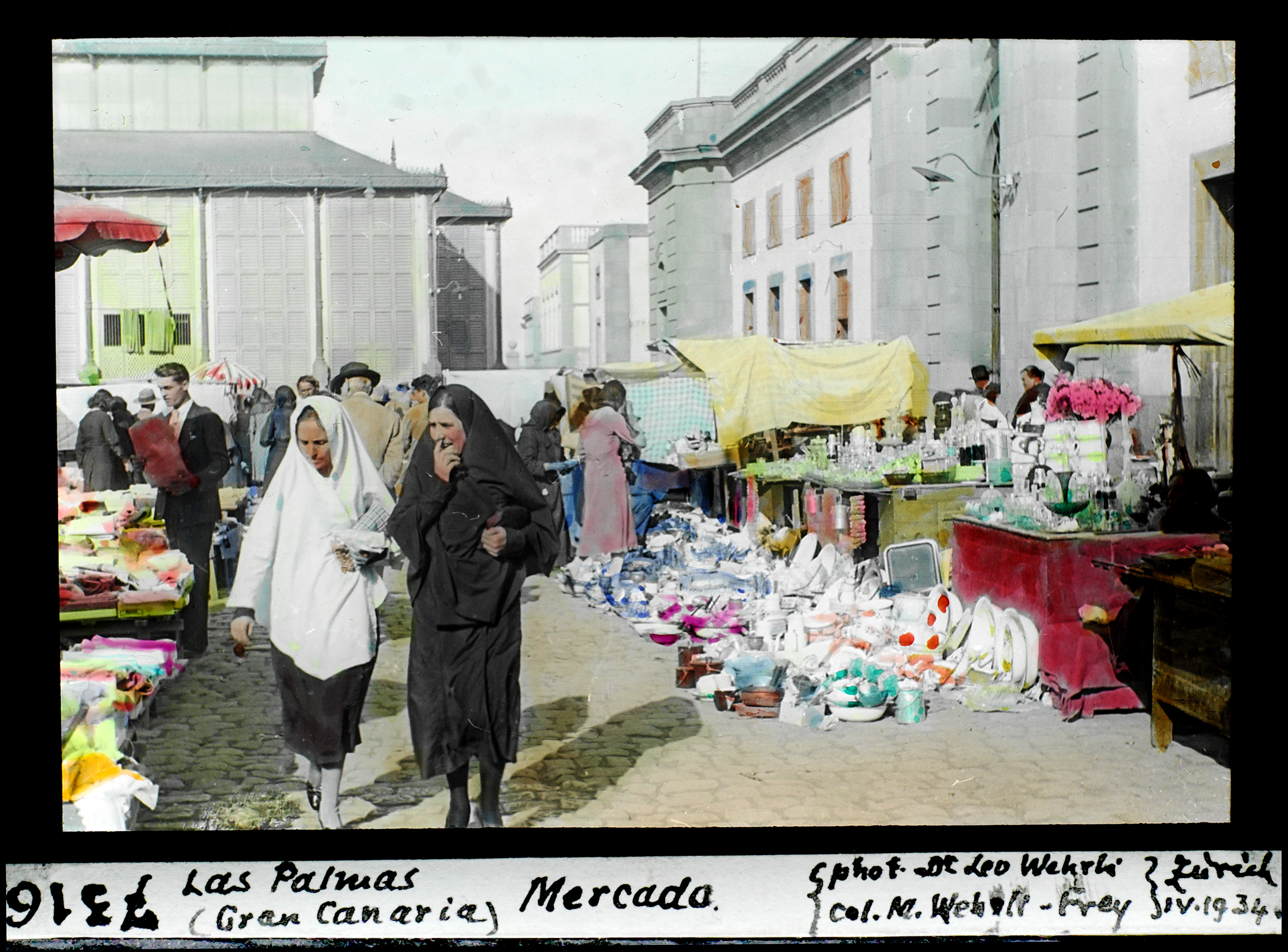
Market in Las Palmas (1934)

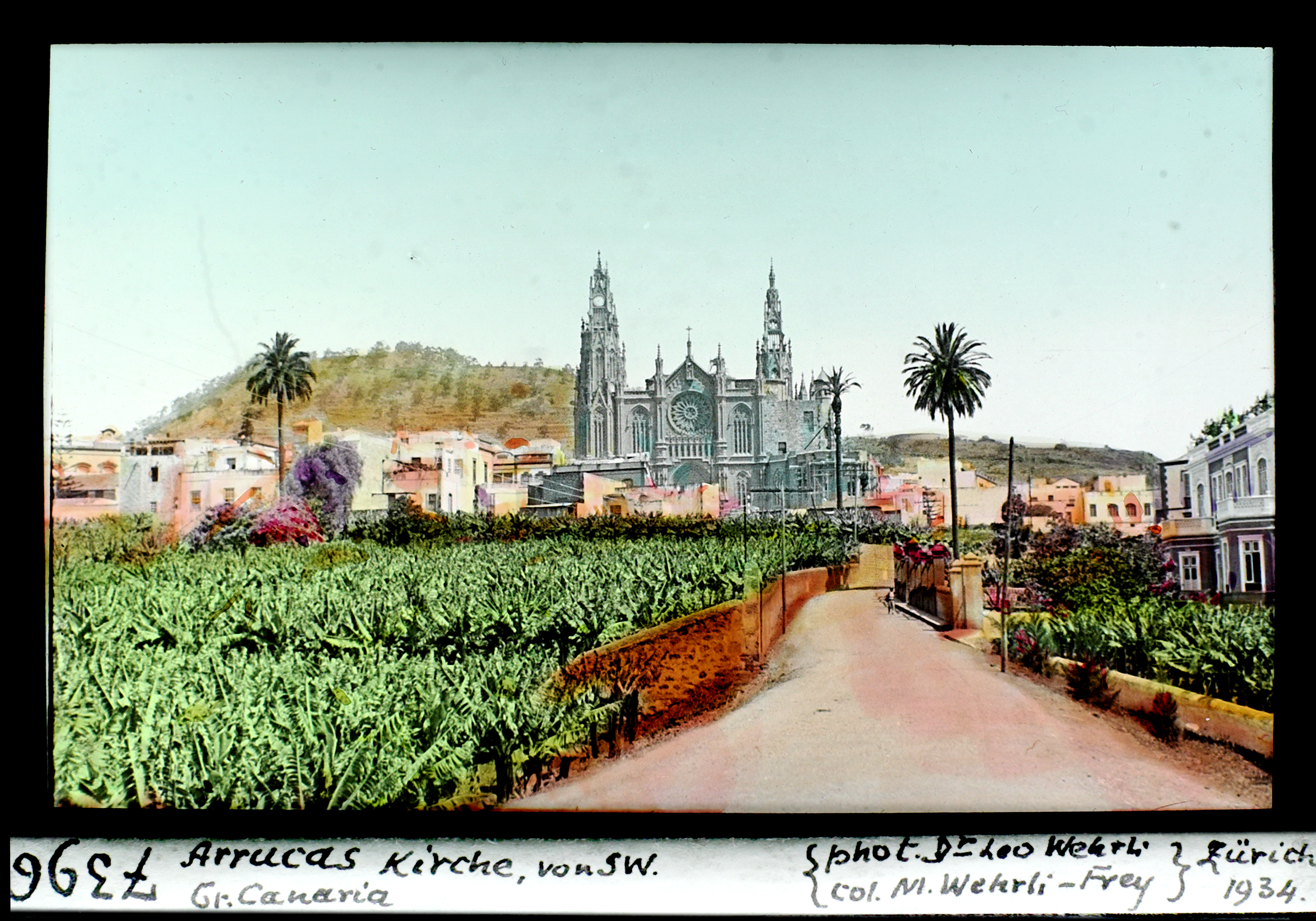
Arucas, Church of the Southwest (1934)

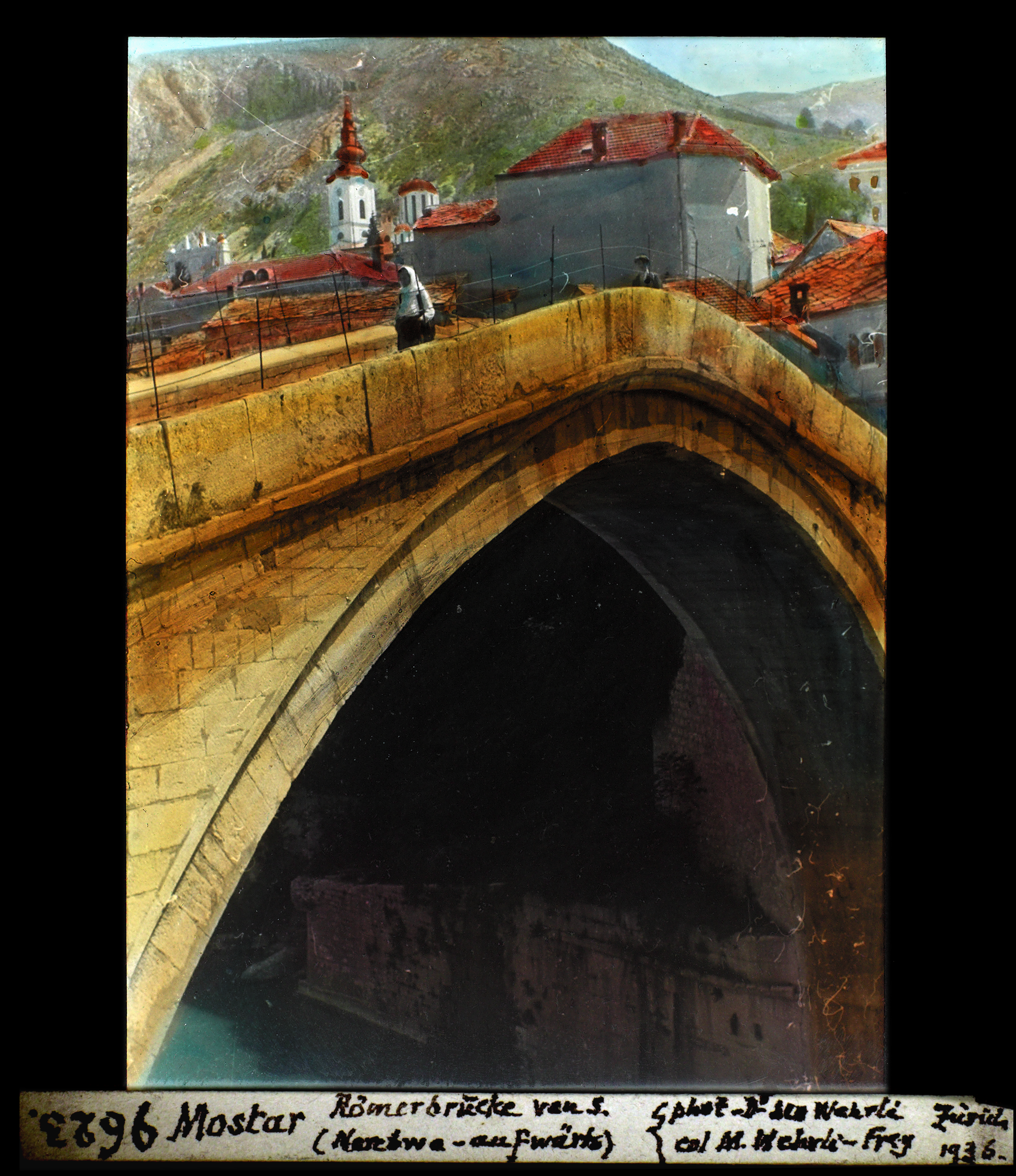
Mostar (1936)

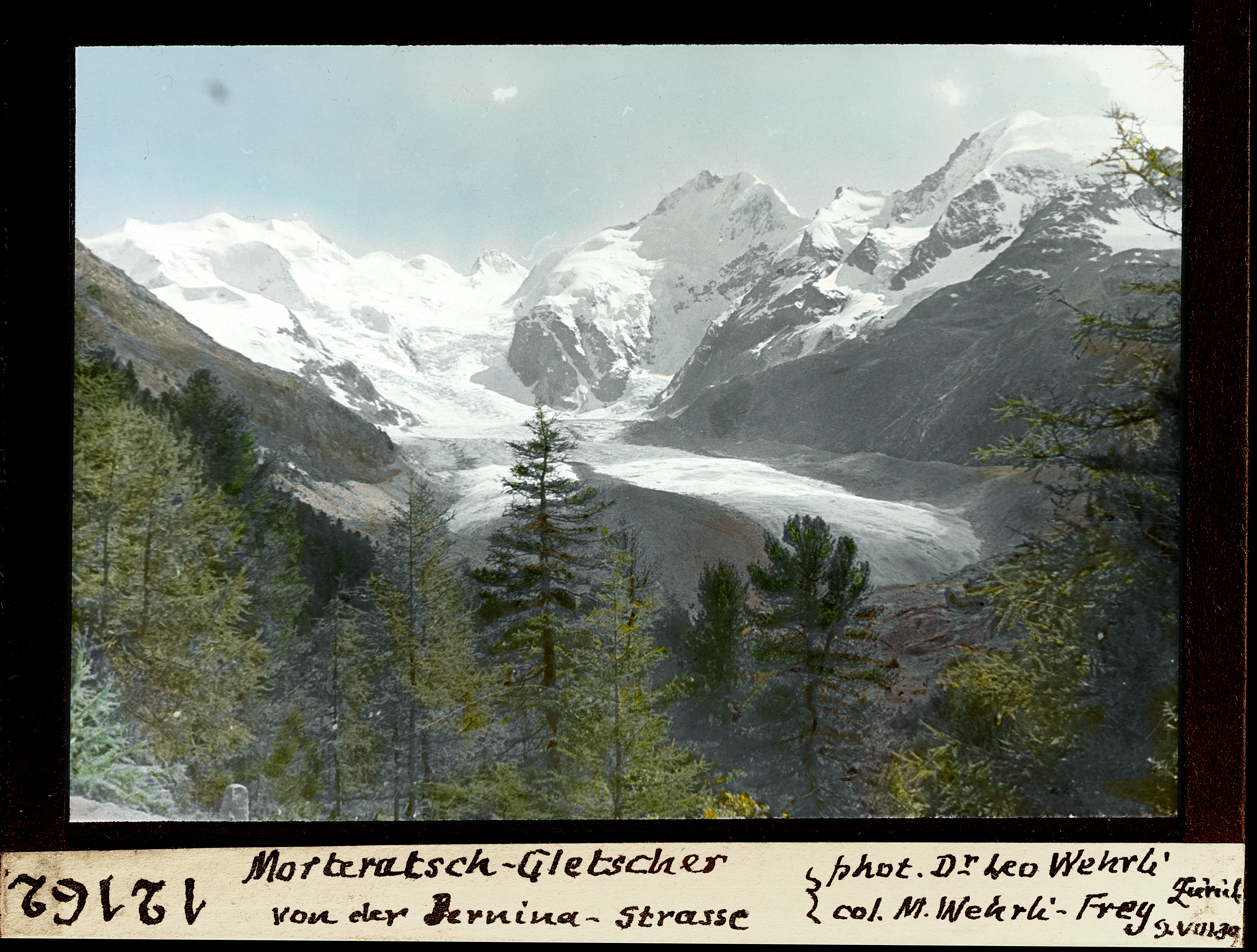
Morteratsch glacier (1939)

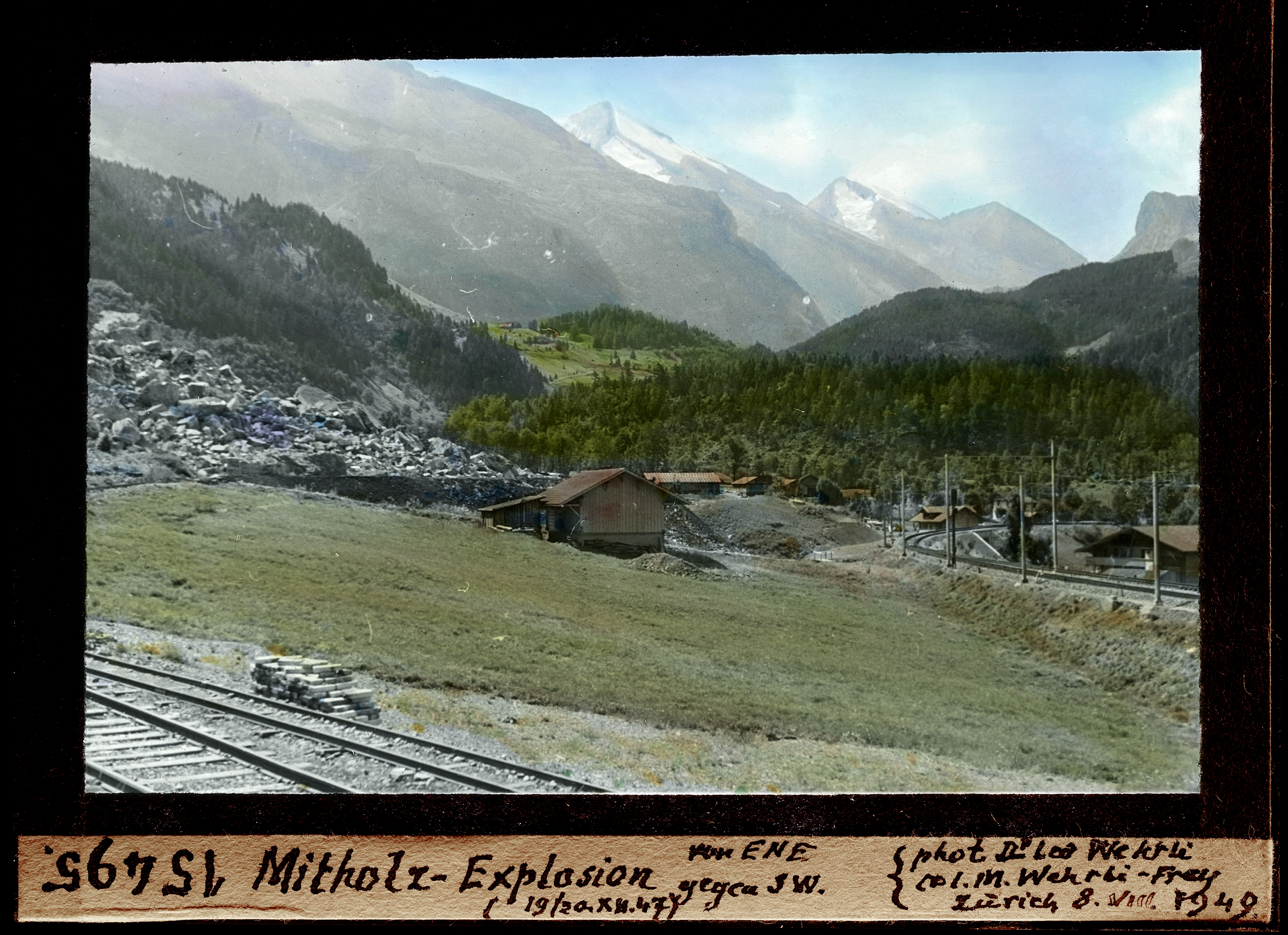
The Catastrophic Mitholz Explosion (1949)

== Publications (Selection) ==
- Der versteinerte Wald zu Chemnitz. (The Petrified Forest of Chemnitz) Beer, Zürich 1915.
- Die postkarbonischen Kohlen der Schweizeralpen. (The post-carboniferous coals of the Swiss Alps) Francke, Bern 1919.
- Übersicht und Geschichte des Bergbaues von seinen Anfängen bis Mitte 1917 mit besonderer Berücksichtigung der Anthrazite der Wallis mit 47 Textfig. (Overview and history of mining from its beginnings to mid-1917 with special consideration of the anthracites of the Valais with 47 text figures) Geogr. Kartenverlag Bern Kümmerly & Frey, Bern 1925.

== Resources ==
- Wikimedia Commons: Leo Wehrli – Collection of pictures, videos and audio files
- Works by Leo Wehrli in the photo archive of the ETH Library
- Publications by and about Leo Wehrli in the Helveticat catalog of the Swiss National Library
- Leo Wehrli on fotoCH
