= Valserhône =

Commune in Auvergne-Rhône-Alpes, France

Valserhône Vâlcerôno (Arpitan)
- Commune
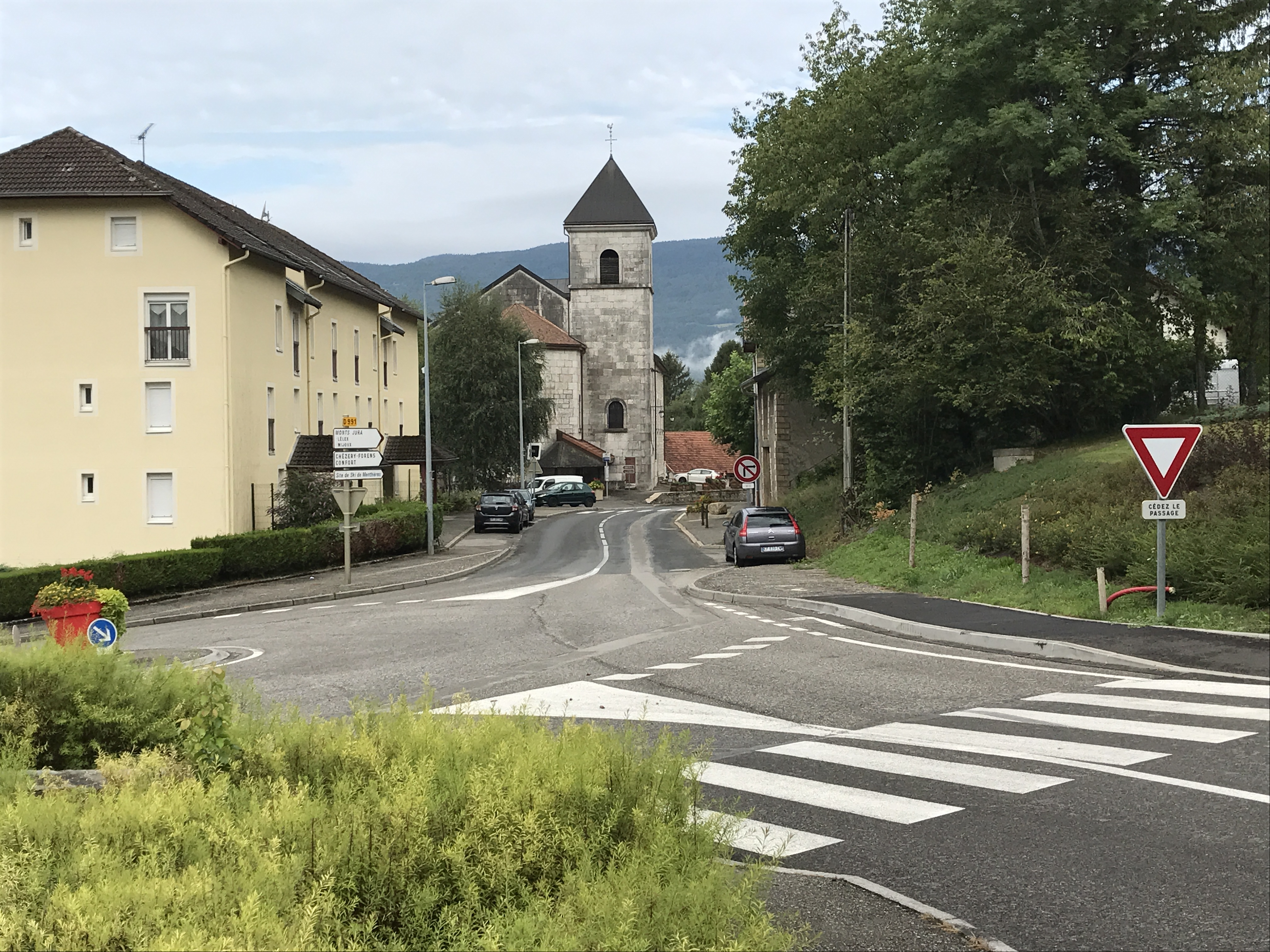
- Location of Valserhône
- Location within France Location within Auvergne-Rhône-Alpes
- Coordinates: 46°06′30″N 5°49′36″E
- Country: France
- Region: Auvergne-Rhône-Alpes
- Department: Ain
- Arrondissement: Nantua
- Canton: Valserhône
- Intercommunality: Terre Valserhône

Government
  - Mayor (2026–32): Anne-Laure Olliet
- Area^{1}: 62.54 km^{2} (24.15 sq mi)
- Elevation: 485 m (1,591 ft)
- Highest elevation: 1,606 m (5,269 ft)
- Lowest elevation: 330 m (1,080 ft)
- Population (2023): 16,712
  - Density: 267.2/km^{2} (692.1/sq mi)
- Time zone: UTC+01:00 (CET)
  - Summer (DST): UTC+02:00 (CEST)
- INSEE/Postal code: 01033 /01200
- ^{1} French Land Register data, which excludes lakes, ponds, glaciers > 1 km^{2} (0.386 sq mi or 247 acres) and river estuaries.

Valserhône (French pronunciation: [valsəʁon]; Arpitan: Vâlcerôno) is a commune in the Ain department in the Auvergne-Rhône-Alpes region in Eastern France. It is the result of the merger, on 1 January 2019, of the communes of Bellegarde-sur-Valserine, Châtillon-en-Michaille and Lancrans. In 2018, the three communes had a combined population of 16,431, with Bellegarde-sur-Valserine as the major population centre. This makes Valserhône the third-most populated commune of Ain, after Bourg-en-Bresse and Oyonnax.

== Geography ==
Valserhône is located at the confluence of the Valserine and the Rhône. It was named after the two rivers. The commune is part of Haut-Jura Regional Natural Park.

The commune has a station, Bellegarde, which is located at the junction of three railway lines and has regular service to various destinations in France and Switzerland.

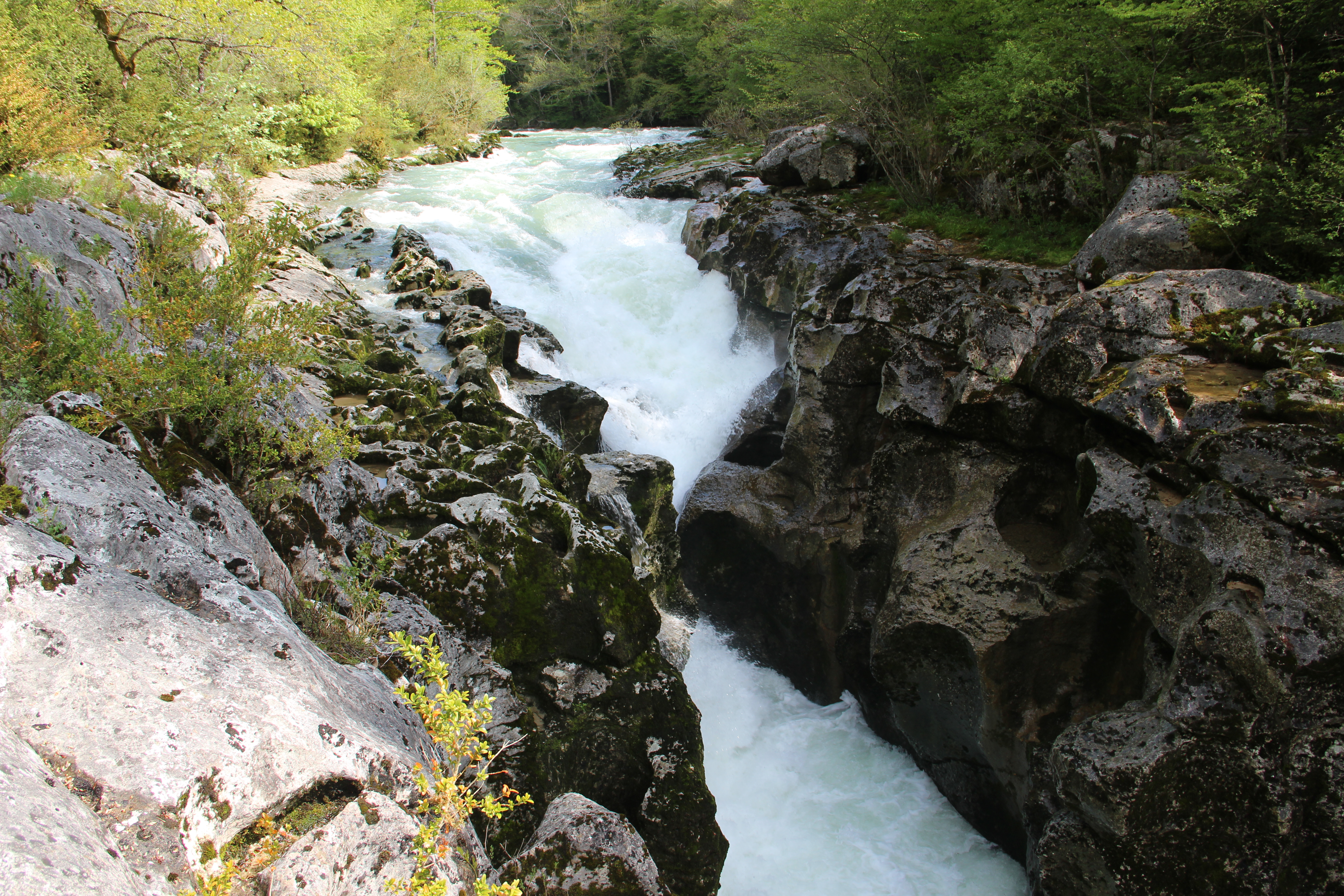
The Valserine in Valserhône

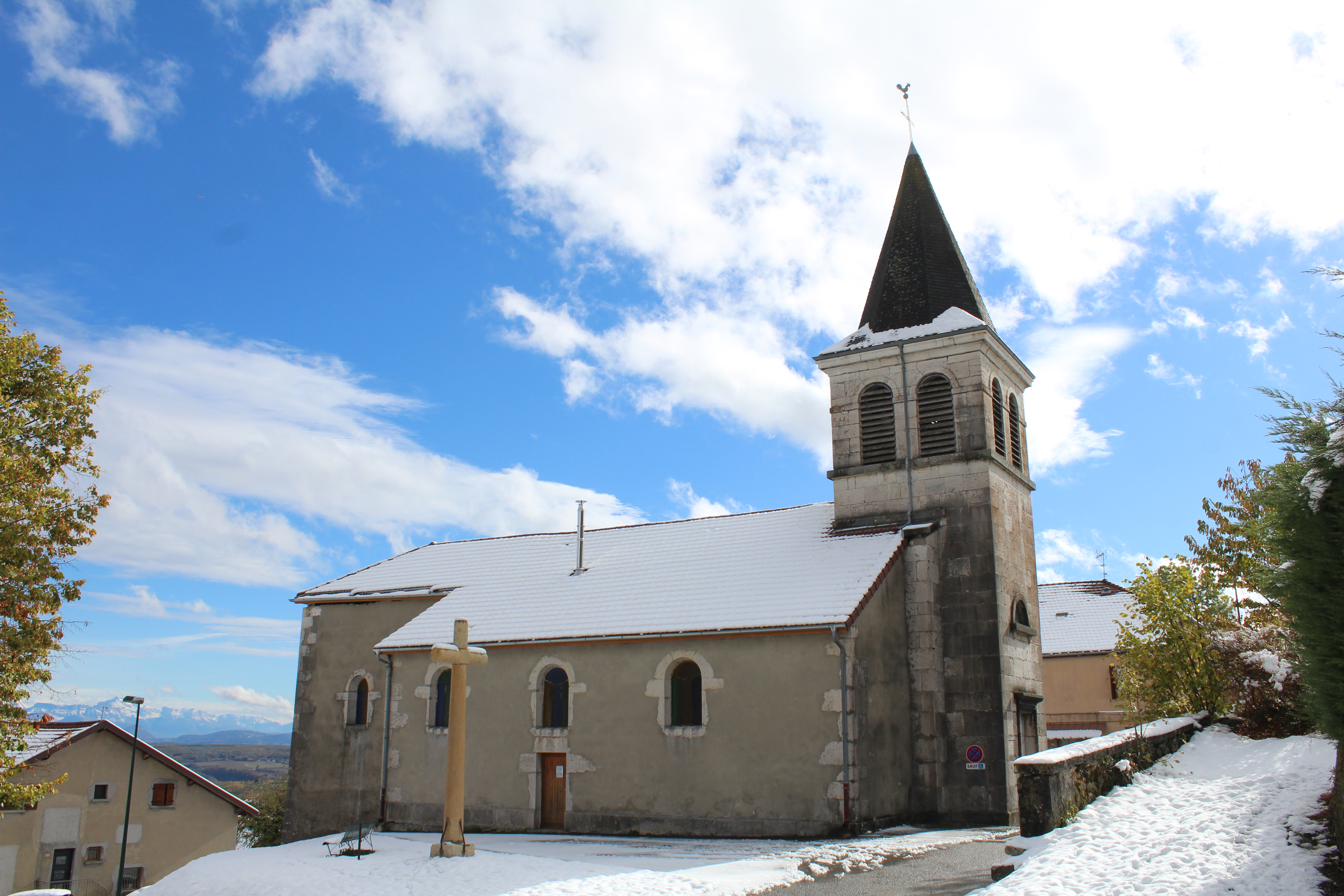
Église Saint-Paul de Vouvray in Châtillon-en-Michaille

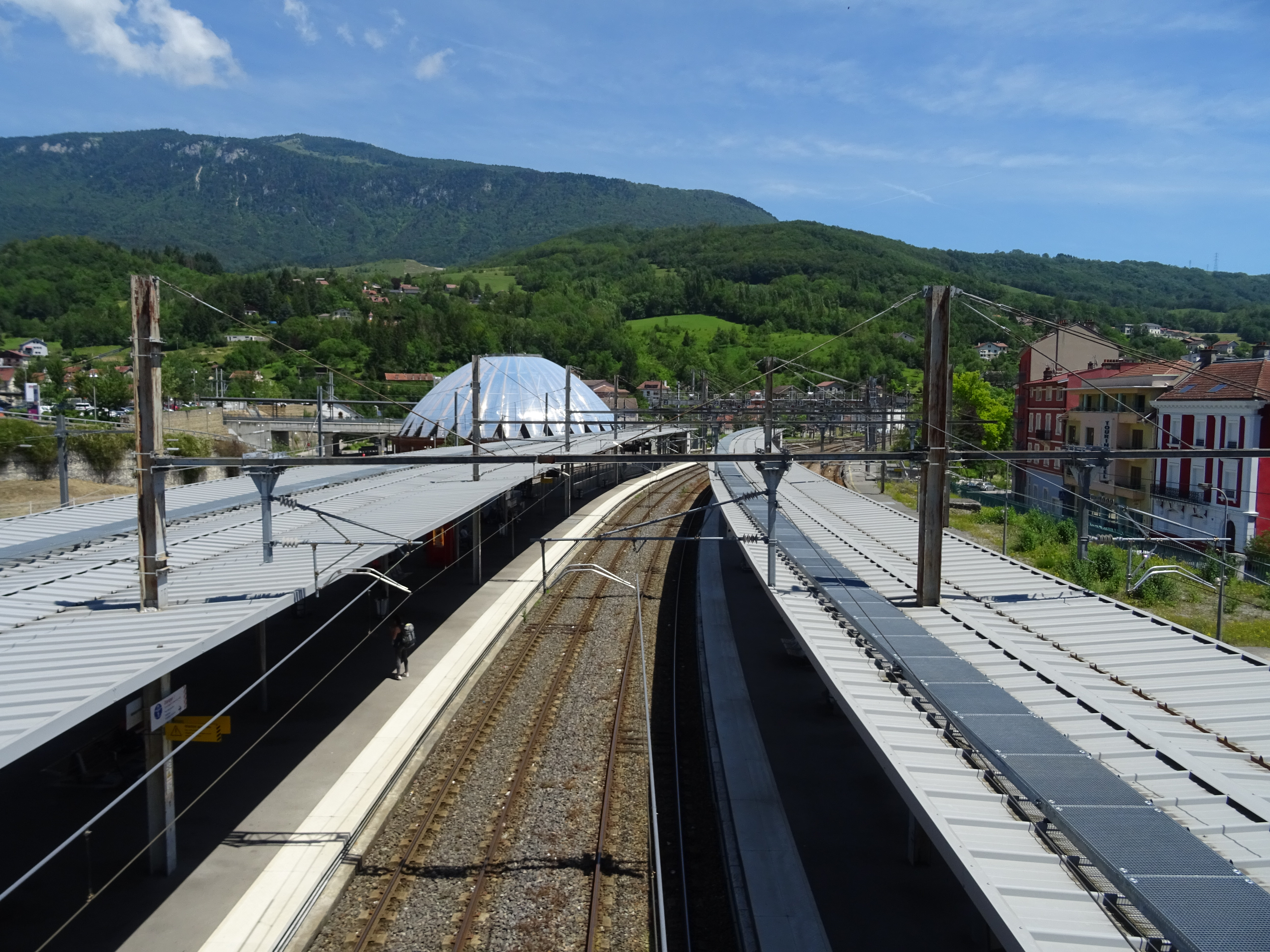
Bellegarde station

=== Climate ===
Valserhône has an oceanic climate (Köppen climate classification Cfb). The average annual temperature in Valserhône is 11.1 °C (52.0 °F). The average annual rainfall is 1,184.6 mm (46.64 in) with December as the wettest month. The temperatures are highest on average in July, at around 20.4 °C (68.7 °F), and lowest in January, at around 2.1 °C (35.8 °F). The highest temperature ever recorded in Valserhône was 39.5 °C (103.1 °F) on 13 August 2003; the coldest temperature ever recorded was −17.0 °C (1.4 °F) on 5 February 2012.

Climate data for Bellegarde-sur-Valserine, Valserhône, Ain, France, Alt. : 350 m, (1991-2020 averages, extremes 1994−present)
Month	Jan	Feb	Mar	Apr	May	Jun	Jul	Aug	Sep	Oct	Nov	Dec	Year
Record high °C (°F)	16.5 (61.7)	20.2 (68.4)	25.4 (77.7)	29.6 (85.3)	33.8 (92.8)	36.5 (97.7)	38.6 (101.5)	39.5 (103.1)	32.7 (90.9)	28.0 (82.4)	22.9 (73.2)	16.4 (61.5)	39.5 (103.1)
Mean daily maximum °C (°F)	5.9 (42.6)	8.3 (46.9)	13.0 (55.4)	17.1 (62.8)	21.0 (69.8)	25.2 (77.4)	27.5 (81.5)	26.9 (80.4)	22.3 (72.1)	17.2 (63.0)	10.5 (50.9)	6.2 (43.2)	16.8 (62.2)
Daily mean °C (°F)	2.1 (35.8)	3.4 (38.1)	7.0 (44.6)	10.7 (51.3)	14.7 (58.5)	18.5 (65.3)	20.4 (68.7)	20.0 (68.0)	16.0 (60.8)	11.9 (53.4)	6.3 (43.3)	2.7 (36.9)	11.1 (52.0)
Mean daily minimum °C (°F)	−1.7 (28.9)	−1.4 (29.5)	1.1 (34.0)	4.3 (39.7)	8.4 (47.1)	11.7 (53.1)	13.4 (56.1)	13.0 (55.4)	9.7 (49.5)	6.6 (43.9)	2.1 (35.8)	−0.9 (30.4)	5.5 (41.9)
Record low °C (°F)	−15.4 (4.3)	−17.0 (1.4)	−13.7 (7.3)	−5.4 (22.3)	−1.4 (29.5)	2.3 (36.1)	5.3 (41.5)	4.7 (40.5)	0.1 (32.2)	−5.5 (22.1)	−10.3 (13.5)	−16.1 (3.0)	−17.0 (1.4)
Average precipitation mm (inches)	116.3 (4.58)	92.5 (3.64)	88.7 (3.49)	81.5 (3.21)	94.2 (3.71)	86.1 (3.39)	86.9 (3.42)	91.4 (3.60)	87.4 (3.44)	108.8 (4.28)	118.7 (4.67)	132.1 (5.20)	1,184.6 (46.64)
Average precipitation days (≥ 1.0 mm)	11.3	9.4	9.9	9.9	11.7	9.4	8.9	9.0	8.5	10.4	11.0	11.4	120.7
Source: Meteociel

== Population ==
Population data refer to the commune in its geography as of January 2025.

Historical population
Year	Pop.	±% p.a.
1968	13,097	—
1975	14,194	+1.16%
1982	13,812	−0.39%
1990	14,157	+0.31%
1999	14,422	+0.21%
2007	15,375	+0.80%
2012	15,764	+0.50%
2017	16,423	+0.82%
2023	16,712	+0.29%
Source: INSEE

== See also ==
- Communes of the Ain department
