= Châtillon =

Châtillon may refer to:

- Châtillon (family)
  - Hugh I of Châtillon
- First Battle of Châtillon during the war in the Vendée (1793), fought in what was then Châtillon-sur-Sèvre (now Mauléon, Deux-Sèvres)
- Battle of Châtillon, fought at Châtillon, Hauts-de-Seine during the Siege of Paris (1870–1871)

It is the name of several places:

- In Belgium
  - Châtillon, Belgium, in the province of Luxembourg
- In Canada
  - Châtillon River, a tributary of Broadback River, in Quebec
- In Italy
  - Châtillon, Aosta Valley
- In Switzerland
  - Châtillon, Fribourg, in the Canton of Fribourg
  - Châtillon, Canton of Jura, in the Canton of Jura
  - Châtillon, Bern, part of the municipality of Prêles in the Canton of Bern
  - Châtillon (peak), a peak in the western Bernese Alps
  - Châtillon-le-Bas, French name for Niedergesteln, canton of Valais
  - Châtillon-sur-Glâne, an archaeological site near Posieux, canton of Fribourg
- In France
  - Châtillon, Allier, in the Allier département
  - Châtillon, Jura, France, in the Jura département
  - Châtillon, Rhône, in the Rhône département
  - Châtillon, Vienne, in the Vienne département
  - Châtillon, Hauts-de-Seine, in the Hauts-de-Seine département
  - Châtillon-Coligny, in the Loiret département
  - Châtillon-de-Michaille, the former name of Châtillon-en-Michaille, in the Ain département
  - Châtillon-en-Bazois, in the Nièvre département
  - Châtillon-en-Diois, in the Drôme département
  - Châtillon-en-Dunois, in the Eure-et-Loir département
  - Châtillon-en-Michaille, in the Ain département
  - Châtillon-en-Vendelais, in the Ille-et-Vilaine département
  - Châtillon-Guyotte, in the Doubs département
  - Châtillon-la-Borde, in the Seine-et-Marne département
  - Châtillon-la-Palud, in the Ain département
  - Châtillon-le-Duc, in the Doubs département
  - Châtillon-le-Roi, in the Loiret département
  - Châtillon-les-Dombes, the former name of Châtillon-sur-Chalaronne, in the Ain département
  - Châtillon-lès-Sons, in the Aisne département
  - Châtillon-Saint-Jean, in the Drôme département
  - Châtillon-sous-Bagneux is the former name of Châtillon, Hauts-de-Seine
  - Châtillon-sous-les-Côtes, in the Meuse département
  - Châtillon-sur-Broué, in the Marne département
  - Châtillon-sur-Chalaronne, in the Ain département
  - Châtillon-sur-Cher, in the Loir-et-Cher département
  - Châtillon-sur-Cluses, in the Haute-Savoie département
  - Châtillon-sur-Colmont, in the Mayenne département
  - Châtillon-sur-Indre, in the Indre département
  - Châtillon-sur-Lison, in the Doubs département
  - Châtillon-sur-Loing is the former name of Châtillon-Coligny, in the Loiret département
  - Châtillon-sur-Loire, in the Loiret département
  - Châtillon-sur-Marne, in the Marne département
  - Châtillon-sur-Morin, in the Marne département
  - Châtillon-sur-Oise, in the Aisne département
  - Châtillon-sur-Saône, in the Vosges département
  - Châtillon-sur-Seine, in the Côte-d'Or département
  - Châtillon-sur-Sèvre, part of Mauléon in the Deux-Sèvres département,
  - Châtillon-sur-Thouet, in the Deux-Sèvres département
