= Bellegarde-sur-Valserine =

Part of Valserhône in Auvergne-Rhône-Alpes, France

Bellegarde-sur-Valserine Bèlagouârda (Arpitan)
- Part of Valserhône
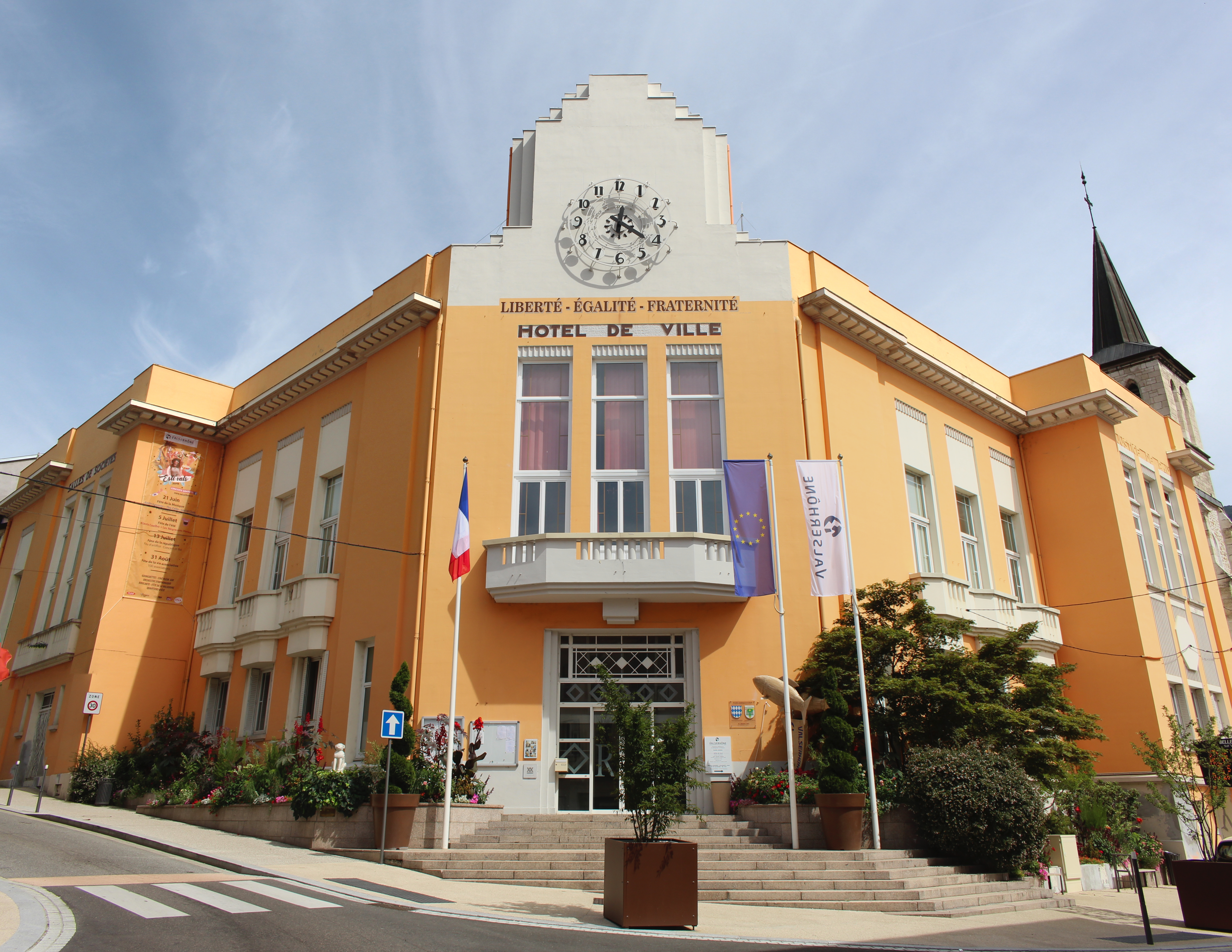
- Former Bellegarde-sur-Valserine Town Hall and current Valserhône Town Hall

- Flag Coat of arms
- Location of Bellegarde-sur-Valserine
- Location within France Location within Auvergne-Rhône-Alpes
- Coordinates: 46°06′30″N 5°49′36″E
- Country: France
- Region: Auvergne-Rhône-Alpes
- Department: Ain
- Arrondissement: Nantua
- Canton: Bellegarde-sur-Valserine
- Commune: Valserhône
- Area^{1}: 15 km^{2} (5.8 sq mi)
- Elevation: 485 m (1,591 ft)
- Highest elevation: 1,542 m (5,059 ft)
- Lowest elevation: 330 m (1,080 ft)
- Population (2022): 11,101
  - Density: 740/km^{2} (1,900/sq mi)
- Time zone: UTC+01:00 (CET)
  - Summer (DST): UTC+02:00 (CEST)
- Postal code: 01200
- ^{1} French Land Register data, which excludes lakes, ponds, glaciers > 1 km^{2} (0.386 sq mi or 247 acres) and river estuaries.

Bellegarde-sur-Valserine (French pronunciation: [bɛlɡaʁd syʁ valsəʁin], literally Bellegarde on Valserine; Arpitan: Bèlagouârda) is a former commune in the Ain department in the Auvergne-Rhône-Alpes region in Eastern France. On 1 January 2019, it was merged into the new commune of Valserhône.

== Geography ==
Bellegarde is located at the confluence of the Valserine and the Rhône.

At this spot, the water of the two rivers runs underground; it was possible to cross both of them easily. Since the inception of the Génissiat Dam at Injoux-Génissiat, the level of the Rhône was raised several metres and the Perte du Rhône submerged. A smaller, similar feature, the Pertes de la Valserine, on the former border with Lancrans, is still visible.

Bellegarde lies in a valley dominated by the Plateau of Retord on the west and the massif of the Grand Crêt d'Eau and the Vuache on the east. The passage created by the Rhône is the principal access to the area around Gex and the north of Lake Geneva. Since 1 January 2019, Bellegarde belongs to a new commune, with Lancrans and Châtillon-en-Michaille, named Valserhône.

Pertes de la Valserine, north of Bellegarde-sur-Valserine
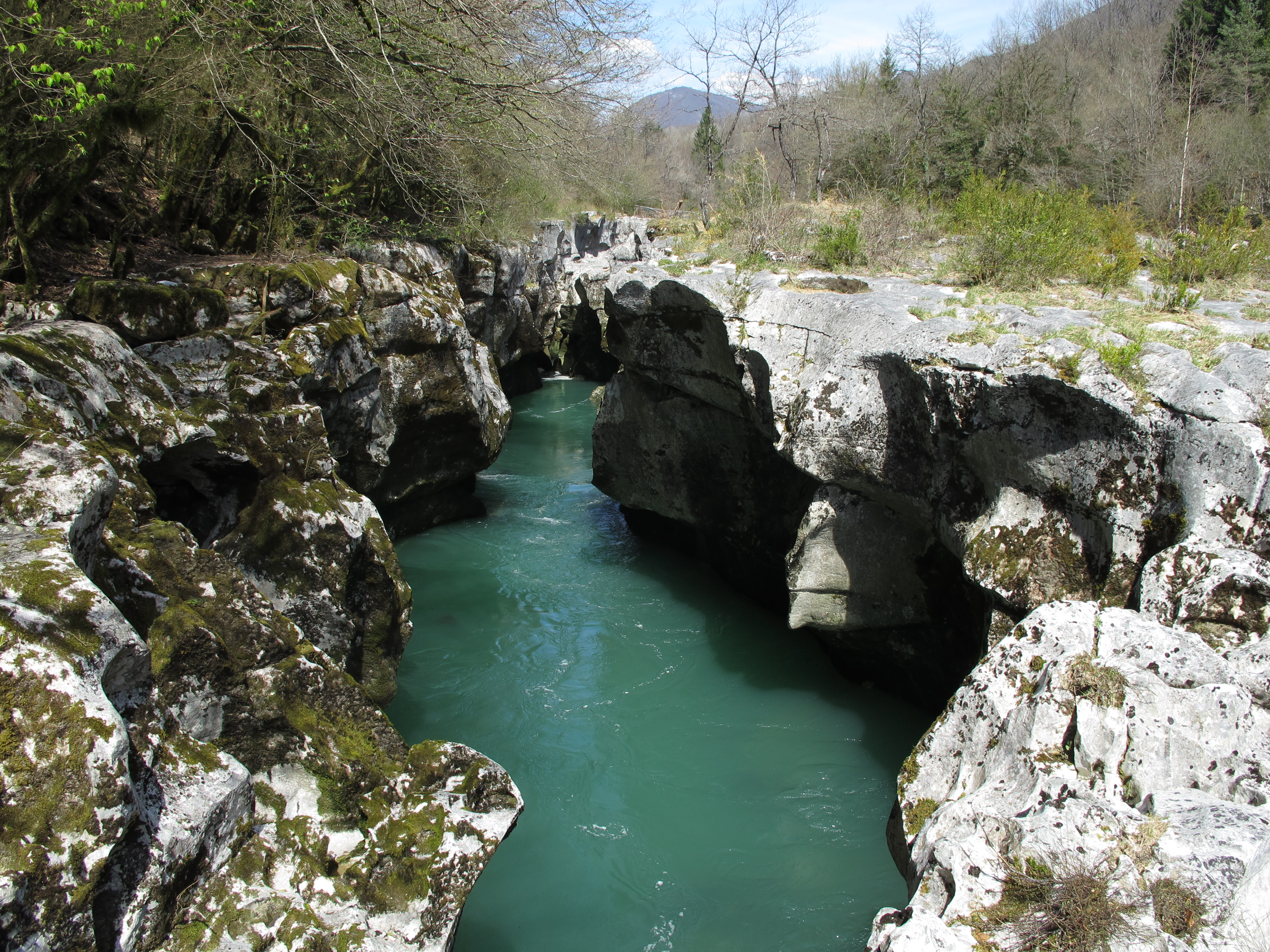

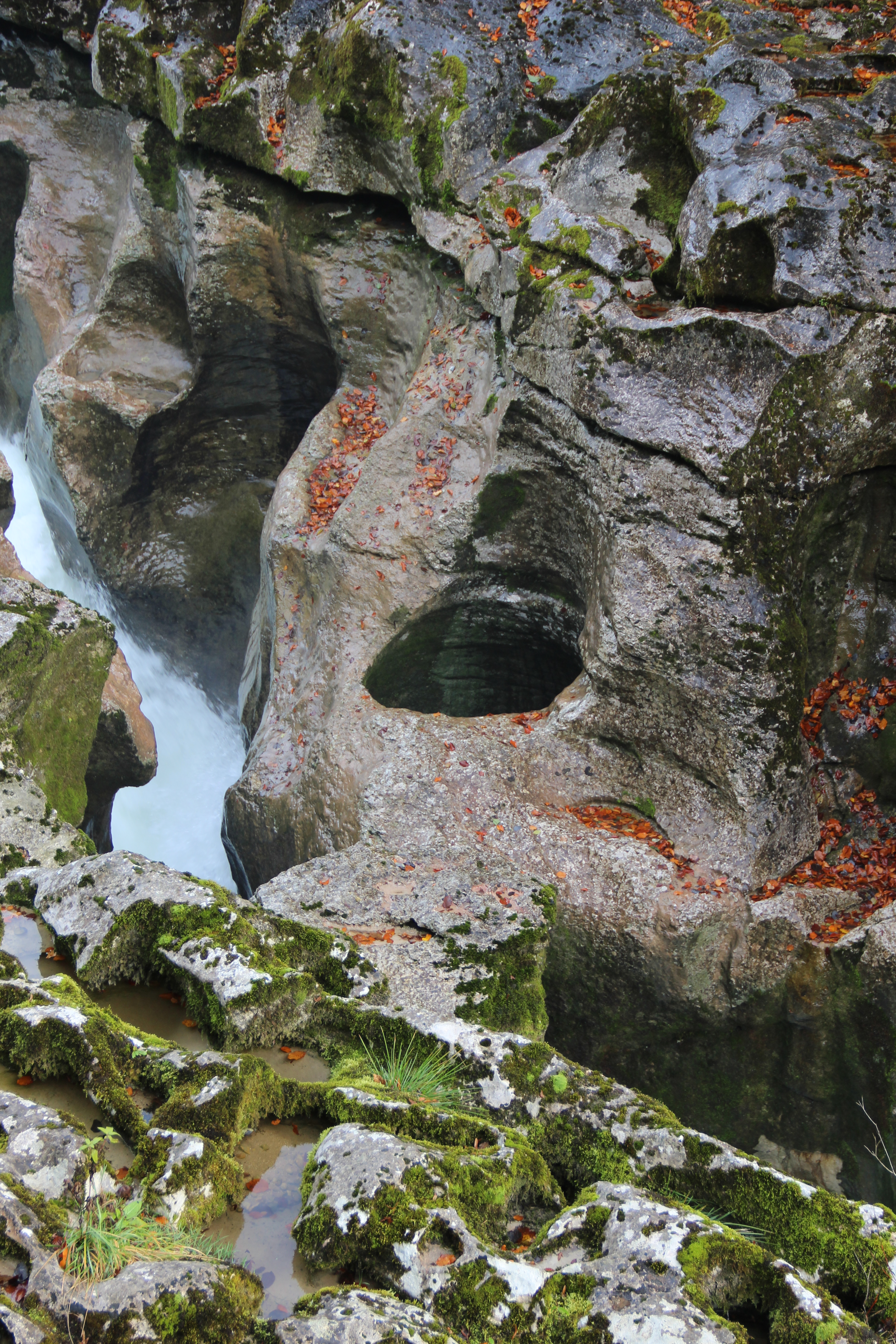

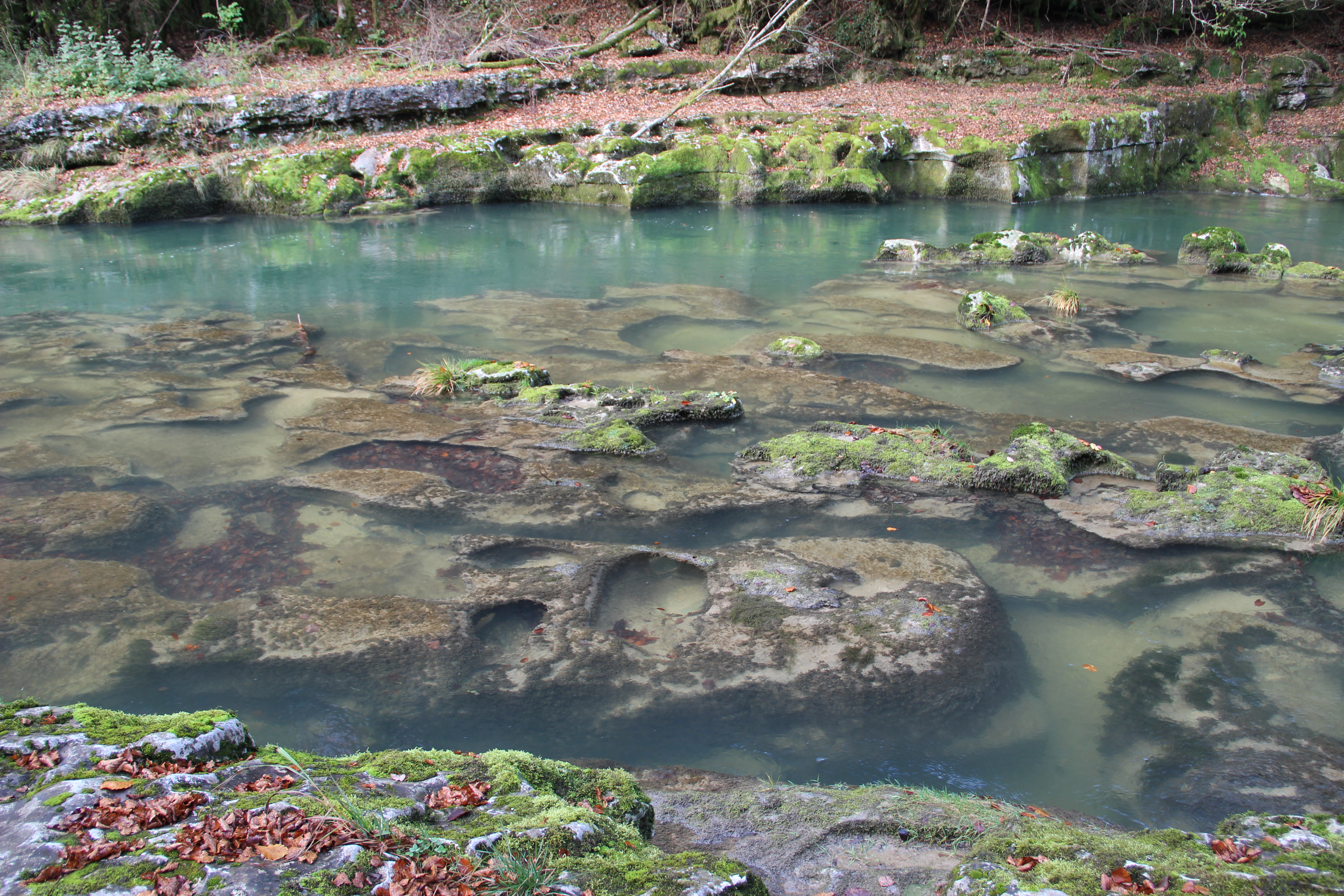

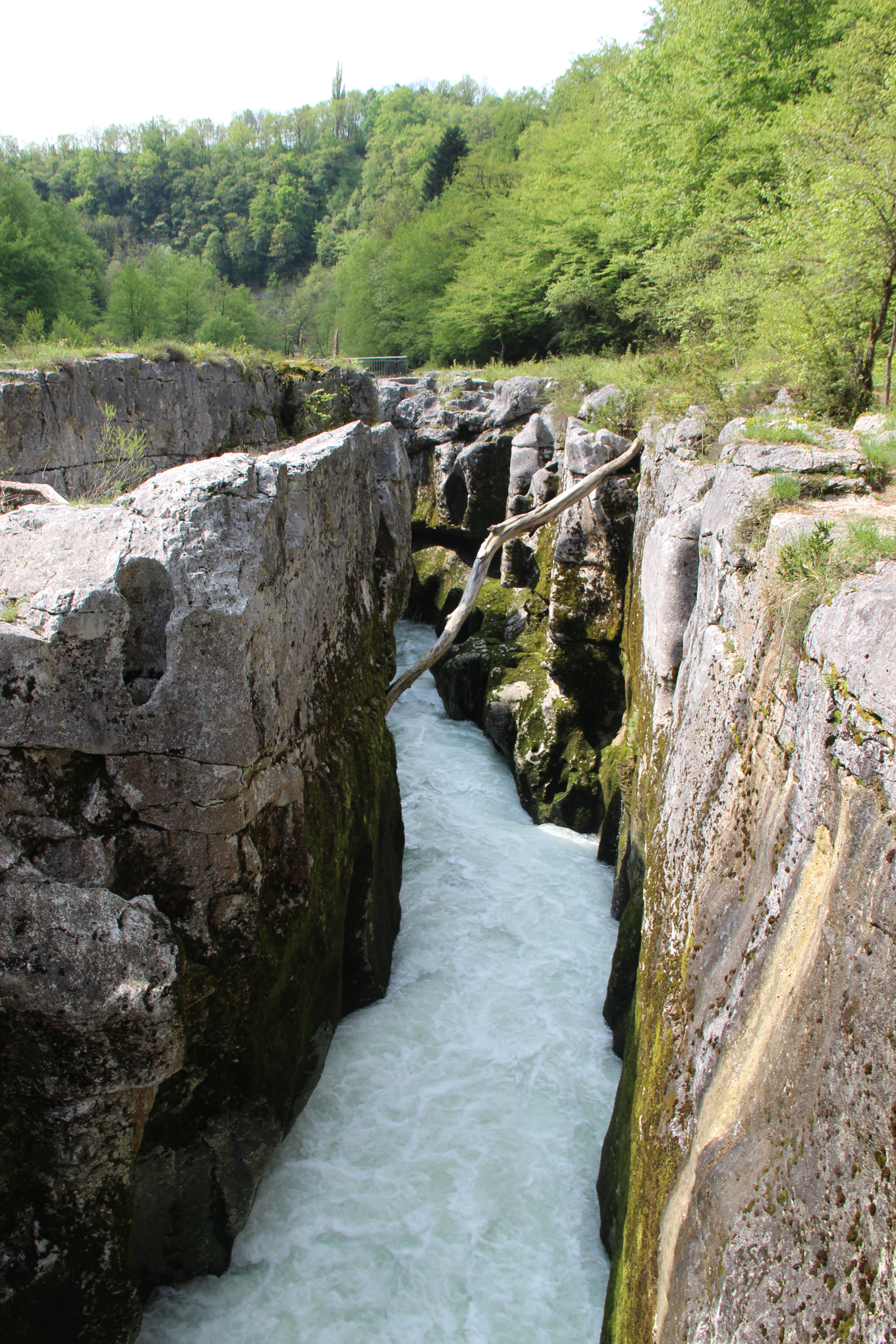

=== Climate ===
Bellegarde is under the influence of both an oceanic climate (notable precipitations in quantity and frequency) and a warm-summer humid continental climate (cold winters and warm to hot summers).

Climate data for Bellegarde-sur-Valserine, Valserhône, Ain, France, Alt. : 350 m, (1981-2010 averages, extremes 1994−present)
Month	Jan	Feb	Mar	Apr	May	Jun	Jul	Aug	Sep	Oct	Nov	Dec	Year
Record high °C (°F)	16.5 (61.7)	20.2 (68.4)	25.4 (77.7)	29.6 (85.3)	33.8 (92.8)	36.5 (97.7)	38.6 (101.5)	39.5 (103.1)	32.7 (90.9)	28.0 (82.4)	22.9 (73.2)	16.4 (61.5)	39.5 (103.1)
Mean daily maximum °C (°F)	5.6 (42.1)	8.3 (46.9)	12.5 (54.5)	16.3 (61.3)	21.0 (69.8)	24.9 (76.8)	27.1 (80.8)	26.3 (79.3)	21.6 (70.9)	17.0 (62.6)	10.1 (50.2)	5.7 (42.3)	16.4 (61.5)
Daily mean °C (°F)	1.8 (35.2)	3.5 (38.3)	6.7 (44.1)	10.2 (50.4)	14.8 (58.6)	18.2 (64.8)	20.2 (68.4)	19.6 (67.3)	15.5 (59.9)	11.8 (53.2)	6.0 (42.8)	2.3 (36.1)	10.9 (51.6)
Mean daily minimum °C (°F)	−1.9 (28.6)	−1.4 (29.5)	0.9 (33.6)	4.0 (39.2)	8.5 (47.3)	11.5 (52.7)	13.3 (55.9)	13.0 (55.4)	9.5 (49.1)	6.6 (43.9)	1.9 (35.4)	−1.2 (29.8)	5.4 (41.7)
Record low °C (°F)	−15.4 (4.3)	−17.0 (1.4)	−13.7 (7.3)	−5.4 (22.3)	−1.4 (29.5)	2.3 (36.1)	5.3 (41.5)	4.7 (40.5)	0.1 (32.2)	−5.5 (22.1)	−10.3 (13.5)	−16.1 (3.0)	−17.0 (1.4)
Average precipitation mm (inches)	109.5 (4.31)	96.6 (3.80)	91.9 (3.62)	87.2 (3.43)	94.0 (3.70)	74.3 (2.93)	85.7 (3.37)	100.2 (3.94)	100.6 (3.96)	106.0 (4.17)	121.2 (4.77)	118.2 (4.65)	1,185.4 (46.67)
Average precipitation days (≥ 1.0 mm)	10.7	9.4	9.9	10.0	11.6	9.0	8.9	9.6	8.9	10.5	11.4	10.8	120.7
Source: Meteociel

== Transport ==
Bellegarde station has rail connections to Paris, Lyon, Annemasse, Geneva, Chambéry and several regional destinations. It lies on the Lyon–Geneva railway.

== Population ==
Historical population
Year	Pop.	±% p.a.
1975	11,593	—
1982	11,097	−0.62%
1990	11,153	+0.06%
1999	10,846	−0.31%
2010	11,790	+0.76%
2015	11,809	+0.03%
2022	11,101	−0.88%
Source: EHESS and INSEE (2010-2022)

== Twin towns — sister cities ==
Bellegarde-sur-Valserine is twinned with:

- Saint-Christophe, Aosta Valley, Italy (2000)
- Bretten, Germany (2001)
