= Eugène Renevier =

Swiss geologist (1831–1906)

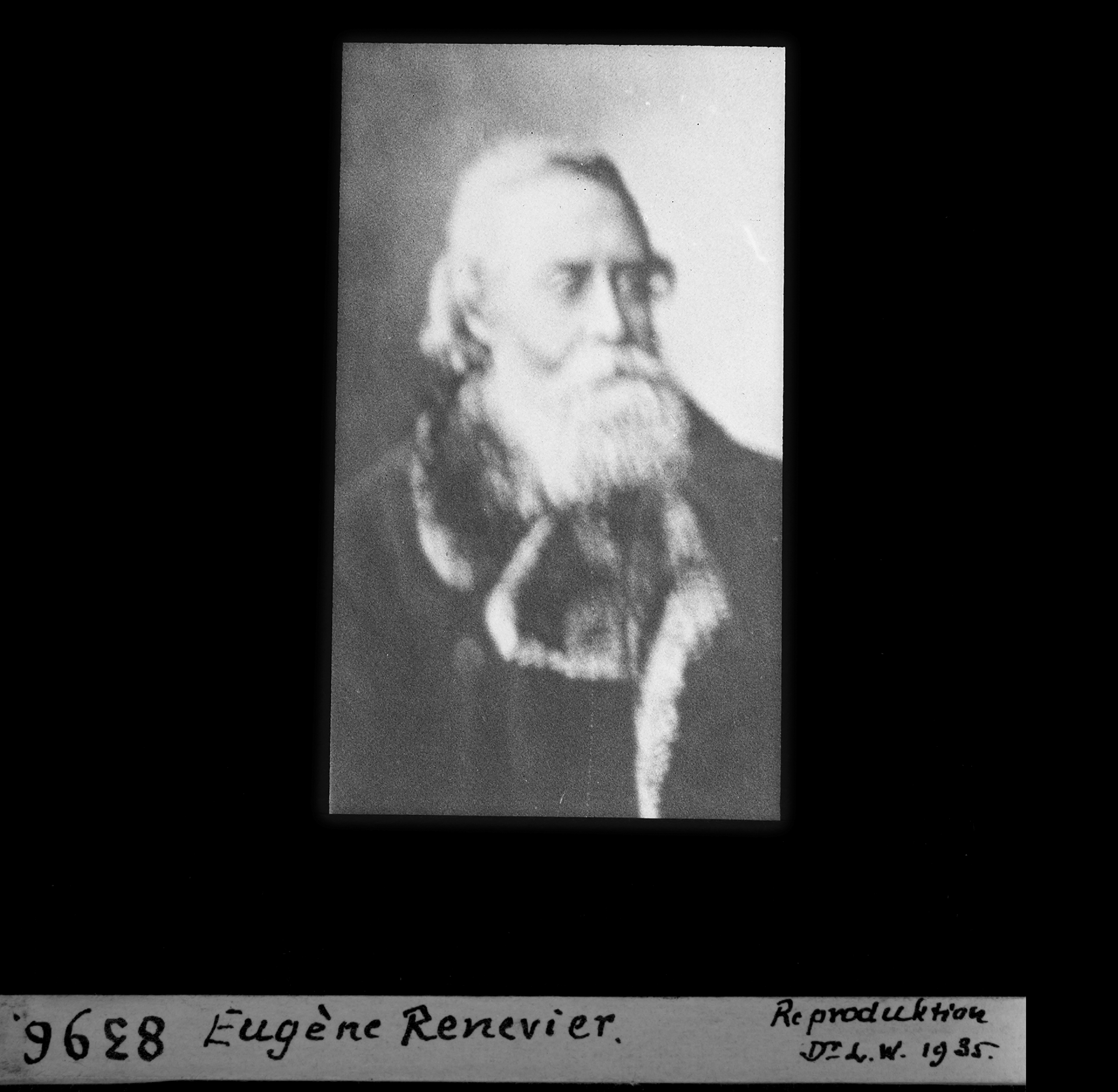
- Born: March 26, 1831; Lausanne, Switzerland
- Died: May 4, 1906 (aged 75); Lausanne, Switzerland
- Citizenship: Swiss
- Education: Polytechnical school of Stuttgart; University of Geneva; University of Paris
- Notable work: Tableau des terrains sédimentaires (1874)
- Awards: Member of the American Philosophical Society (1879)
- Scientific career
- Fields: Geology, Paleontology, Mineralogy
- Workplaces: University of Lausanne
- Doctoral advisor: F. J. Pictet

Eugène Renevier (26 March 1831 – 4 May 1906) was a Swiss geologist.

== Biography ==
Renevier was born in Lausanne, Switzerland on 26 March 1831, as a descendant of a noble family.

After about three years of study at the polytechnical school of Stuttgart, Renevier in 1851 went to Geneva to study under F. J. Pictet. In 1854 he went to Paris to attend the lectures of Hébert and to study fossil nummulites found in the limestone of the Alps.

From 1859 to 1881 he was an associate professor of geology and mineralogy, then a full professor of geology and paleontology at the Academy in Lausanne (1881–1906). In 1890 the academy attained the name and status of a university. In 1898–90 he was rector of the University of Lausanne. For many years, he also served as curator of the cantonal museum of geology (1874–1906).

He is distinguished for his researches on the geology and paleontology of the Alps, on which subjects he published numerous papers in the proceedings of the scientific societies in Switzerland and France. With F. J. Pictet he wrote a memoir on the Fossiles du terrain aptien de la Perte-du-Rhone (1854). In 1894 he was appointed president of the Swiss Geological Commission, and also of the International Geological Congress held that year at Zürich, in the previous meetings of which he had taken a prominent part. He published a noteworthy Tableau des terrains sédimentaires (1874); and a second more elaborate edition, accompanied by an explanatory article Chronographe géologique, was issued in 1897 as a supplement to the Report of the Zürich Congress. This new table was printed on colored sheets, the colors for each geological system corresponding with those adopted on the International geological map of Europe.

In 1879, he was elected as a member to the American Philosophical Society.
