= ETH Library =

Swiss public library

Coordinates: 47.3763°N 8.5476°E

- Location: Zurich, Switzerland
- Type: Scientific library, University library
- Established: 1855

Collection
- Size: Over 8,450,000 items

Other information
- Director: Rafael Ball
- Website: www.library.ethz.ch

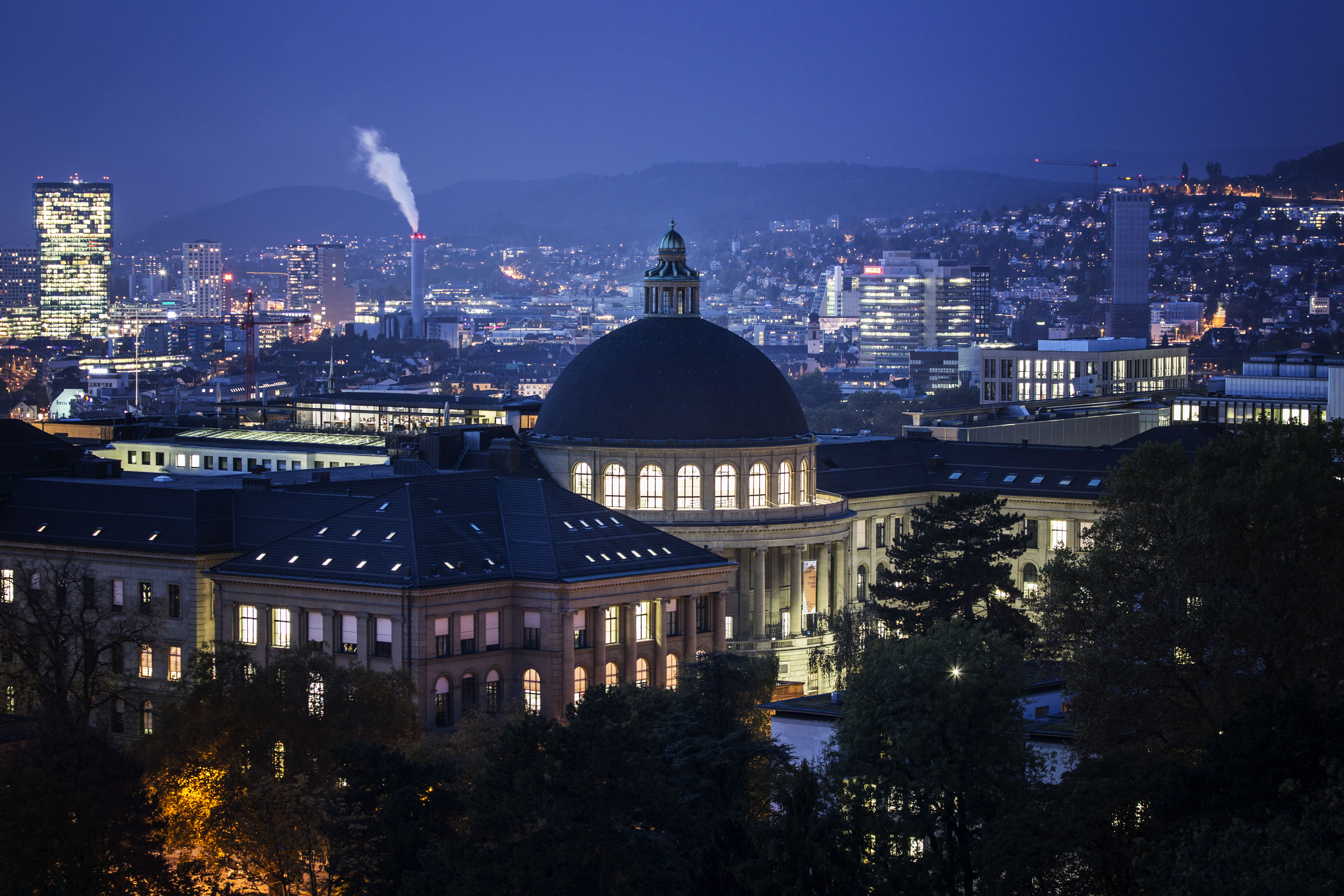
ETH Zurich in the evening

The ETH Library, serving as the central university library at ETH Zurich, has a notable collection of scientific and technical information. It is considered one of the largest public scientific and technical libraries in Switzerland. Furthermore, it offers resources for the public and companies in research and development. Particular emphasis is placed on electronic information for university members and the development of innovative services.

== Collection focuses ==
ETH Library collects media from the following fields:

- Architecture
- Building sciences
- Engineering
- Natural sciences and mathematics
- System-oriented natural sciences
- Management and social sciences

== Special Libraries ==
ETH Library's four special libraries are responsible for supplying subject-specific literature to the corresponding departments and institutes at ETH Zurich. Their holdings are also generally available to the interested public. The special libraries include:

- Architecture and Civil Engineering Library: architecture, urban and spatial planning; Material Collection:
- Earth Sciences Library: geosciences
- GESS Library: humanities, social sciences, economics, law and politics
- Green Library: agricultural and food science, environmental science

== Collections and Archives ==
ETH Library's Collections and Archives contain valuable original holdings of scientific and cultural-historical relevance. The Collections and Archives include:

- Rare Books: works from the 15th to the 20th century
- #Image Archive: historical photographs, aerial photographs, press photographs, portraits, postcards and much more.
- Earth Science Collections: fossils, minerals, rocks and reliefs
- ETH Zurich's Collection of Prints and Drawings: Switzerland's largest collection of printed works
- University Archives: Administrative Archives of ETH Zurich and the ETH Board, personal papers of scientists
- Maps: historical and modern, topographical and topical maps
- Material Collection: building and historical materials
- Max Frisch Archive: personal papers Max Frisch, primary and secondary literature
- Cultural Assets Collection: art objects, art in architecture, the Sternwarte Collection
- Thomas Mann Archive: personal papers Thomas Mann, primary and secondary literature

=== Image Archive ===
Image Archive of ETH Library
- Location: Rämistrasse 101, Zurich, Switzerland
- Type: Image Archive
- Established: 2000

Collection
- Size: c. 3.2 million images

Other information
- Website: ETH Library’s Image Archive

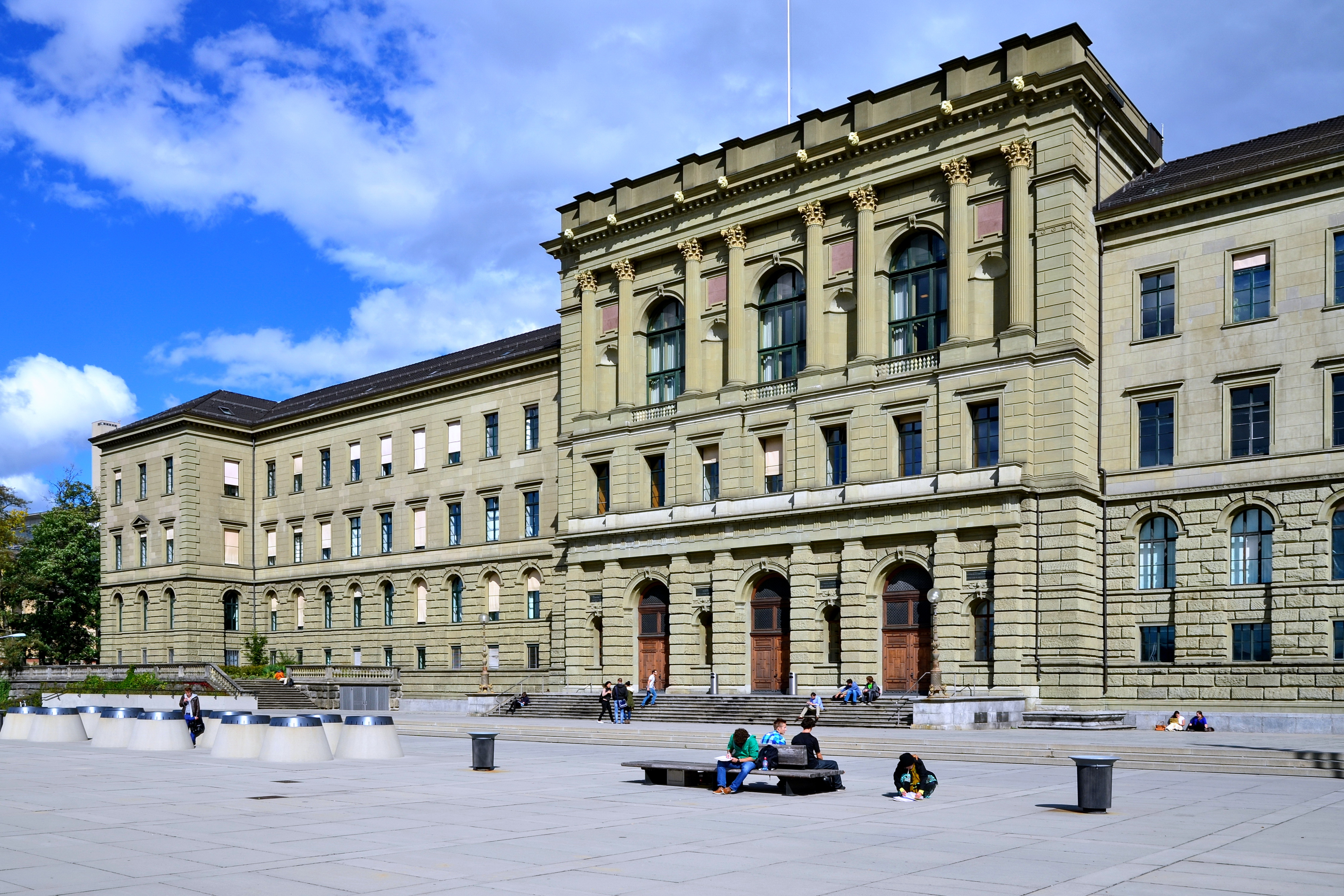
The Image archive is located in the main building of ETH Zurich

The Image Archive of ETH Library indexes the library's image holdings. Its nationally and internationally significant image holdings document the development of ETH Zurich, research expeditions, settlement development and changes in society, politics and technology in Switzerland. Launched in 2000 as an organizational unit of ETH Library, the Image Archive curates a large number of image holdings acquired by the library in recent decades, such as within the scope of academic legacies. Searches and online access to the Image Archive's digitized holdings are available via E-Pics Bildarchiv Online. A growing number of sub-holdings are also available on Wikimedia Commons. In the series Image Worlds (photographs from ETH Library's Image Archive), the archive's core holdings are presented thematically in texts and pictures.

==== Content-related focuses ====
ETH Library's Image Archive includes image holdings with a direct relation to the history of ETH Zurich and its architectural and staff development. In particular, this includes:

- scenes (from around 1860 onwards): historical photographs of buildings, institutes, lecture theaters and laboratories at ETH Zurich
- portraits: portraits of former members and students of ETH Zurich and notable scientists
- photograph collections from institutes at ETH Zurich: e.g. Geobotanical Institute/Rübel Foundation, Geological Institute, Institute of Aerodynamics, Institute of Building Conservation (Georg Mörsch) or the Photographic Institute
- photographs and drawings from the personal papers of former professors at ETH Zurich: e.g. Albert Frey-Wyssling, Immanuel Friedlaender, Albert Heim, Arnold Heim, Robert Maillart, Leopold Ruzicka, Carl Schroeter, Leo Wehrli or Hans Leibundgut

The Image Archive has some extensive image holdings bearing a broader relation to science and technology and topics such as civil aviation, landscape and settlement development, architecture or nature photography:

- Foundation Luftbild Schweiz Archive (1918–2011): aerial photographs by Walter Mittelholzer from flights over Switzerland and to Persia, South Africa, Chad, Abyssinia, Svalbard or as the first to fly over Kilimanjaro, portrait and landscape shots of Switzerland, taken by the Swissair Photo AG
- Swissair Photo Archives (1931–2001): photographs and films on civil aviation, the aviation business and aircraft and destinations of the former Swiss airline Swissair
- Comet Photo AG Archive (1952–1999): media images on topics such as architecture, culture, nature, politics, prominence, sport, technology, and transport about Switzerland
- Scenes (from around 1860 onwards): landscapes and views of locations (primarily Switzerland)
- Other private image holdings: Photo archive of the foundation Documenta Natura, photo archive of the Industriekultur Foundation of Dr Hans-Peter Bärtschi, aerial image archive of Air Color SA (Meyrin), nature photographs by Albert Krebs and orchid photographs by Hans R. Reinhard

The image materials serve as a primary information source and reference material for studies on image production and usage. Last but not least, the copies, negatives, glass slides and individual films also document the technical development of the image as a medium.

== Selected key figures for ETH Library's holdings ==
ETH Library's holdings comprise around 8 million analog and around 550.000 digital resources. As of September 2022, these include:

Analog resources

Monographs and journal volumes	3'003'361
Image documents	3'791'324
Maps	343'096
Archival material in linear meters	5'025

Digital resources

Digital image documents	876'620
E-books	957'993
Dissertations, articles and reports in the ETH E-Collection	82'716
Licensed e-journals	45'196
Databases	150

The holdings of all ETH Zurich libraries, as well as more than 490 libraries across Switzerland, are available on ETH Library @ swisscovery. ETH Library @ swisscovery therefore provides access to more than 30 million books, series, journals and non-book materials.

== Digital search platform ==
=== Research Collection ===
The Research Collection is ETH Zurich's publication platform. University members can publish their scientific full texts open access as well as archive their research data and make them accessible to the public. Furthermore, the Research Collection records all publications produced at ETH Zurich and serves as a source for publication lists in academic reporting and on ETH Zurich's websites.

=== Other nationally relevant platforms operated by ETH Library ===
- e-rara.ch: digitized prints from Swiss libraries from the 15th to the 19th century
- e-manuscripta.ch: digitized handwritten sources from Swiss libraries and archives
- E-Pics: digitized photographs, image documents and 3D scans from collections, archives, institutes and units of ETH Zurich and external partners
- E-Periodica: digitized Swiss journals in the fields of science and culture from the 18th century to the present day
- Thomas Mann: manuscripts and press articles on Thomas Mann

== Selected services ==
=== Circulation courier ===
Library customers have the option of having documents from the institutions participating in the Swiss Library Service Platform delivered to the library of their choice.

=== DOI Desk ===
ETH Zurich's DOI Desk is located at the ETH Library and acts as a central DOI registration center for universities and research institutions in Switzerland. This service is also provided in collaboration with DataCite.

=== Research Data Management and Digital Curation ===
The specialist Research Data Management and Digital Curation office advises researchers at ETH Zurich on aspects of handling research data and digital data in general. The ETH Data Archive provides the technical infrastructure for the electronic long-term archiving and publication of this data.

=== E-Publishing office ===
As a central contact point for open access within ETH Zurich, ETH Library helps members of ETH Zurich to publish their dissertations, articles, reports and much more in a freely accessible way online.

=== DigiCenter ===
The Digitization Centre at the ETH Library is the service provider and competence center in the fields of digitization and the handling of metadata. In cooperation with various institutions of ETH Zurich and Swiss libraries, it carries out large-scale and high-quality digitization projects.

== Ongoing projects ==
ETH Library conducts some future-oriented projects, which ensure that the service and product portfolio is geared towards the needs of the target groups.
