= Perte du Rhône =

Coordinates: 46.1035°N 5.8364°E

The Perte du Rhône at the end of the 18th century

The Perte du Rhône (Loss of the Rhône) is a 60-metre-deep (200 ft) geologic fault just upstream of Bellegarde-sur-Valserine in France, into which the Rhône River used to disappear during the dry season. It marked the border between Ain and Haute-Savoie.

In 1948, the Génissiat Dam, designed by French architects Albert Laprade and Léon Bazin, was built to the south of Bellegarde. With the construction of the dam, the Perte du Rhône was transformed into a reservoir 23 kilometres (14 mi) long, from Génissiat to the Swiss border. A similar feature called Pertes de la Valserine still exists in the same area.

In 1854, Eugène Renevier, Professor of Geology and Paleontology at the University of Lausanne, wrote Fossiles du terrain aptien de la Perte-du-Rhône with François Jules Pictet de la Rive.

== See also ==
- List of hydroelectric power stations
