= Châtillon-en-Michaille =

Part of Valserhône in Auvergne-Rhône-Alpes, France

- Part of Valserhône
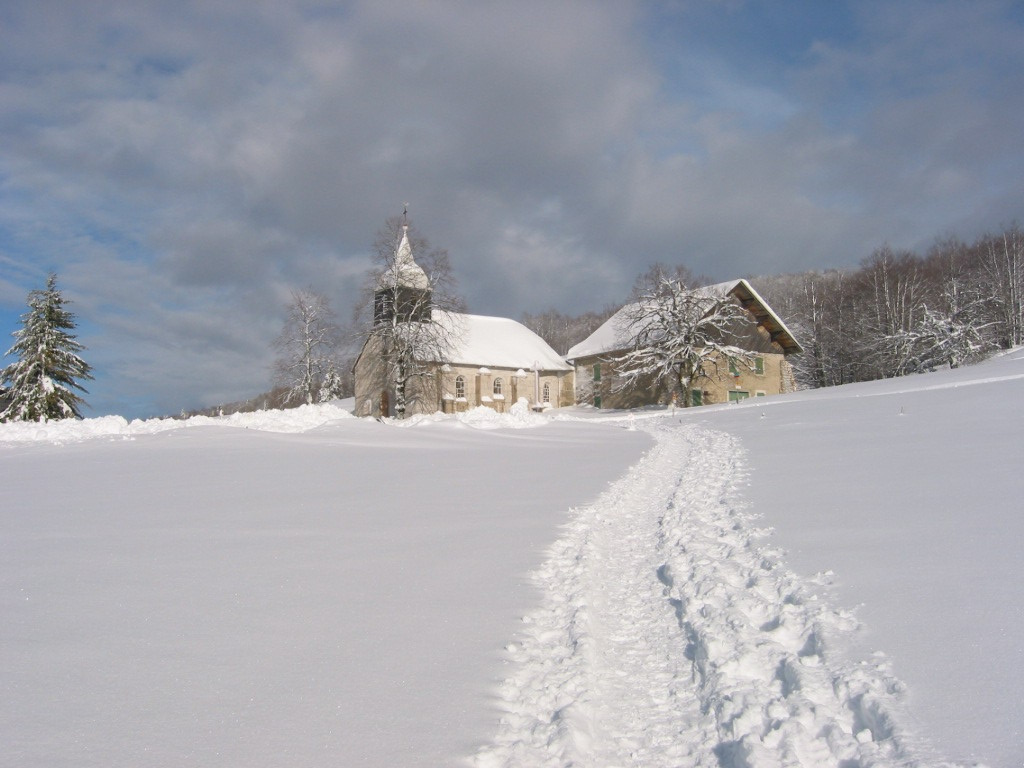

- Coat of arms
- Location of Châtillon-en-Michaille
- Location within France Location within Auvergne-Rhône-Alpes
- Coordinates: 46°08′43″N 5°48′02″E
- Country: France
- Region: Auvergne-Rhône-Alpes
- Department: Ain
- Arrondissement: Nantua
- Canton: Bellegarde-sur-Valserine
- Commune: Valserhône
- Area^{1}: 37.63 km^{2} (14.53 sq mi)
- Elevation: 520 m (1,710 ft)
- Highest elevation: 1,241 m (4,072 ft)
- Lowest elevation: 373 m (1,224 ft)
- Population (2022): 3,987
  - Density: 106.0/km^{2} (274.4/sq mi)
- Time zone: UTC+01:00 (CET)
  - Summer (DST): UTC+02:00 (CEST)
- Postal code: 01200
- ^{1} French Land Register data, which excludes lakes, ponds, glaciers > 1 km^{2} (0.386 sq mi or 247 acres) and river estuaries.

Châtillon-en-Michaille (French pronunciation: [ʃatijɔ̃ ɑ̃ miʃaj]; Arpitan: Châtelyon) is a former commune in the Ain department in eastern France. On 1 January 2019, it was merged into the new commune of Valserhône.

== Population ==
Historical population
Year	Pop.	±% p.a.
1975	1,765	—
1982	1,963	+1.53%
1990	2,189	+1.37%
1999	2,641	+2.11%
2006	2,948	+1.58%
2010	3,120	+1.43%
2015	3,448	+2.02%
2022	3,987	+2.10%
Source: EHESS and INSEE (1968-2022)

== See also ==
- Communes of the Ain department
