= Valserine =

River in eastern France

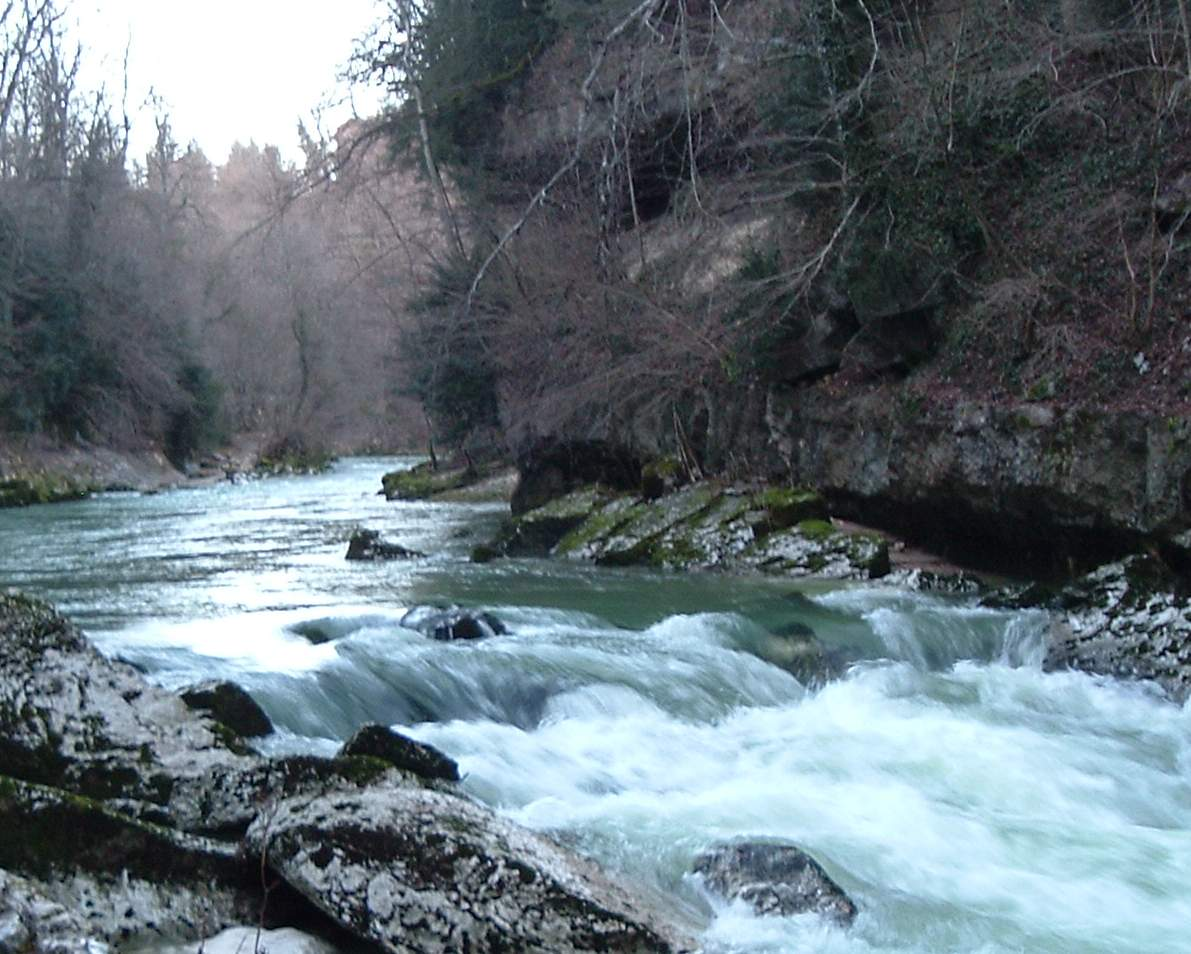
- The Valserine at Bellegarde-sur-Valserine

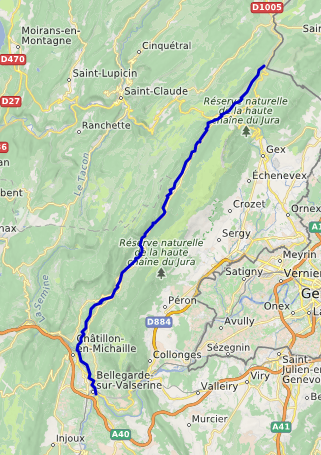

Location
- Country: France

Physical characteristics
- Source
  - location: Jura Mountains
- Mouth: Rhône
  - location: Bellegarde-sur-Valserine
  - coordinates: 46.1062°N 5.8292°E
- Length: 48 km (30 mi)

Basin features
- Progression: Rhône→ Mediterranean Sea

The river Valserine (French pronunciation: [valsəʁin]) is a tributary of the Rhône that flows for 47.6 kilometres (29 5/8 miles) from the Col de la Faucille in the Jura Mountains to its confluence with the Rhône at Bellegarde-sur-Valserine. The Valserine Valley has great charm; it includes the Pont des Pierres that spans the river between Montanges and Mulaz (in the commune of Confort), as well as the Pertes de la Valserine just north of Bellegarde-sur-Valserine, a canyon in which during the dry season the Valserine runs underground.

As the river flows through the village of Mijoux, it marks the border between Ain (a department in the Auvergne-Rhône-Alpes region) and Jura (in Bourgogne-Franche-Comté).

The name Valserine stems from a univerbation of val + serine, where val is an ellipsis (omission) of ruisseau de val (valley stream), and serine is likely a hydronym from a different river, from the alternate spelling serein, itself derived from Latin serēnus.

== See also ==
- Frainc-Comtou dialect
- Parc naturel régional du Haut-Jura
- Jura Mountains
