= Confort =

Commune in Auvergne-Rhône-Alpes, France

- Commune
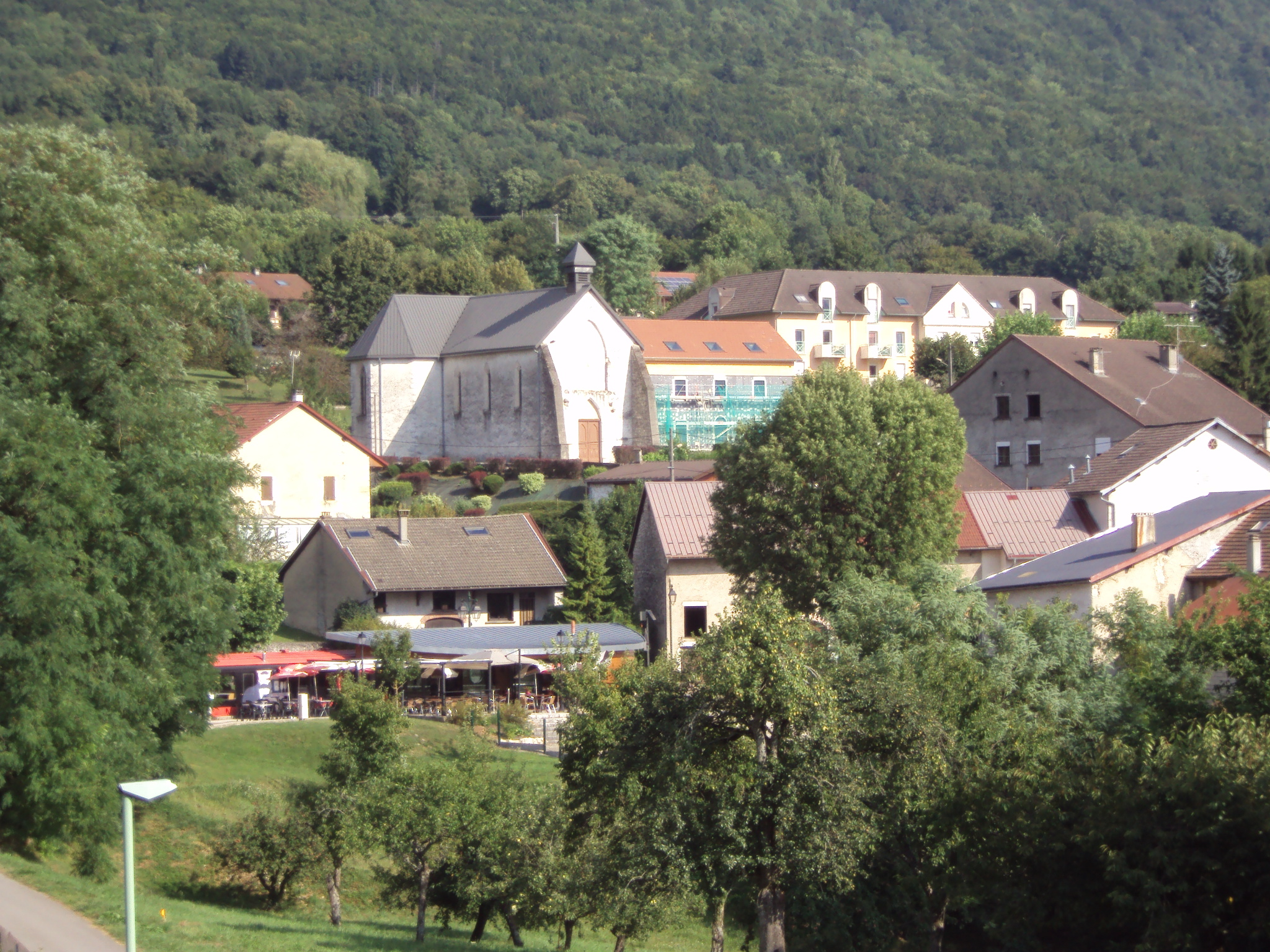
- Location of Confort
- Location within France Location within Auvergne-Rhône-Alpes
- Coordinates: 46°09′02″N 5°49′25″E
- Country: France
- Region: Auvergne-Rhône-Alpes
- Department: Ain
- Arrondissement: Nantua
- Canton: Valserhône
- Intercommunality: Terre Valserhône

Government
  - Mayor (2026–32): Antony Rochette
- Area^{1}: 11.66 km^{2} (4.50 sq mi)
- Elevation: 550 m (1,800 ft)
- Highest elevation: 1,621 m (5,318 ft)
- Lowest elevation: 375 m (1,230 ft)
- Population (2023): 668
  - Density: 57.3/km^{2} (148/sq mi)
- Time zone: UTC+01:00 (CET)
  - Summer (DST): UTC+02:00 (CEST)
- INSEE/Postal code: 01114 /01200
- ^{1} French Land Register data, which excludes lakes, ponds, glaciers > 1 km^{2} (0.386 sq mi or 247 acres) and river estuaries.

Confort (French pronunciation: [kɔ̃fɔʁ]) is a commune in the Ain department in eastern France.

== Population ==
Historical population
Year	Pop.	±% p.a.
1968	349	—
1975	377	+1.11%
1982	397	+0.74%
1990	449	+1.55%
1999	499	+1.18%
2007	515	+0.40%
2012	553	+1.43%
2017	648	+3.22%
2023	668	+0.51%
Source: INSEE

== See also ==
- Communes of the Ain department
