= Louis Bouquet =

French painter

- Born: 6 December 1885; Lyon, France
- Died: 25 February 1952 (aged 66); Lyon, France
- Known for: Painting, illustration, murals

Louis Bouquet (6 December 1885 – 25 February 1952) was a French artist and illustrator.

Louis Bouquet was born in Lyon on 6 December 1885. He attended the École nationale des beaux-arts de Lyon and then the École des beaux-arts in Paris. He was taught by Fernand Cormon, and worked with the Nabi painter Maurice Denis. He exhibited his paintings at the Salon d'Automne, the Société des Artistes Indépendants and the Tuileries. His work includes portraits, nudes, genre scenes, biblical and literary scenes and allegorical subjects. He made several paintings of Orpheus. He also illustrated books. He visited Tunisia in 1919, where he became acquainted with Islamic art.

Bouquet created two frescos for the Palace of the Colonies, or the Palais de la Porte Dorée, for the 1931 Paris Colonial Exposition. In style they are reminiscent of the Orientalism of the previous century, which was again in vogue. Although the murals are strong artistic works, they are unquestioning in their acceptance of France's colonial destiny. The murals remain, although the building now houses the Cité nationale de l'histoire de l'immigration. Bouquet created a painting named Souvenir du Musée des Colonies that depicts the men who worked on the pavilion: the architects Albert Laprade and Léon Bazin, the sculptor Alfred Janniot, the decorator Jacques-Émile Ruhlmann and himself. The painting also includes an anonymous black woman wearing only a skirt, resembling Josephine Baker, who represents the indigenous colonial people.

Bouquet often worked with the architect Michel Roux-Spitz during the inter-war period. For Roux-Spitz's Hôtel des Postes on the Place Antonin-Poncet in Lyon he contributed a huge mural 54 metres (177 ft) long and covering about 250 square metres (2,700 sq ft) of the lobby wall. The mural was created between 1935 and 1938 while the hotel was being built. It allegorically represents the global connections of the city of Lyon, connected by radio waves to cities around the world, and depicts the modernity of the city, with airplanes, ships, trains, hydroelectricity and industry, and everywhere youth. In reality, Lyon was suffering economically at the time, and the mural represented an optimistic view of the city as it would like to be seen.

Louis Bouquet died in Saint-Rambert-l'Île-Barbe, Lyon on 25 February 1952.
