= Dušan Maravić =

Serbian footballer (1939–2025)

Personal information
- Date of birth: 7 March 1939
- Place of birth: Injoux-Génissiat, France
- Date of death: 6 January 2025 (aged 85)
- Position: Midfielder

Youth career
- 1945–1955: Radnički Bajmok

Senior career*
Years	Team	Apps	(Gls)
1956–1958	Spartak Subotica	29	(5)
1958–1964	Red Star Belgrade	82	(22)
1964–1966	Racing Paris	43	(20)
1966–1968	Entente BFN	5	(4)
1967	→ Béziers (loan)	9	(0)
1969–1973	Deportivo Italia		

International career
1960	Yugoslavia	7	(3)
Medal record
Men's Football
Representing Yugoslavia
Olympic Games
Gold medal – first place	1960 Rome	Team
- * Club domestic league appearances and goals

Dušan Maravić (Serbian Cyrillic: Душан Маравић; 7 March 1939 – 6 January 2025) was a Serbian footballer who played as a midfielder. He represented the SFR Yugoslavia national team internationally and was part of the Yugoslav squad that won gold at the 1960 Summer Olympics.

== Early life ==
Maravić was born in France, as his father was working in Injoux-Génissiat, a small village close to Swiss border. After the Second World War his family moved back to Yugoslavia, settling in Bajmok, a village close to Subotica.

== Playing career ==
His first football steps were taken in local club Radnički Bajmok when Maravić was six years old. Ten years later he joined the more famous Spartak Subotica. In 1958, aged 19 he became a member of Yugoslavian giants Red Star Belgrade. In six years with Red Star, Maravić appeared in 232 official matches, scoring 82 goals.

Maravić was also member of SFR Yugoslavia national team playing in seven occasions, and scored three goals. Thanks to being member of gold Olympic medal squad, he was allowed to go abroad before national propositions limit of 28. Hence, he became a member of Racing Paris aged 25. He played for "The Penguins" until 1969 when he shortly moved to OFK Beograd, and then proceeded to Venezuelan Deportivo Italia. He played with this italo-Venezuelan team until 1974, winning the Venezuelan championship in 1972

== Post-playing career ==
After retiring as a player, Maravić spent some time coaching and also working in national football union administration, which led him to become an employee of UEFA and FIFA as an international instructor and delegate. He was nominated to run for FIFA president.

== Personal life and death ==
Maravić was fluent in French, English, Spanish and Italian. Simultaneously with his sporting career, Maravić had pursued studies, finishing University of Belgrade Faculty of Economics. He had sons Antoni and Alfredo, the latter works as a sports agent.

Maravić died on 6 January 2025, at the age of 85.
