= Léon Bazin =

French architect

- Born: 1900; Lausanne, Switzerland
- Died: 1976 (aged 75–76); Paris, France
- Occupation: Architect

Léon-Emile Bazin (1900–1976) was a French architect.

== Life ==
Léon-Emile Bazin was born in Lausanne, Switzerland, in 1900. In 1915 he joined the firm of Henri Prost, where he met Albert Laprade and Joseph Marrast. In 1923 he enrolled in the École nationale supérieure des Beaux-Arts, and graduated in 1930. In 1925 Bazin entered into a partnership with Albert Laprade that lasted until 1936. Bazin won a competition in 1929 for the Porte d'Honneur of the 1931 Paris Colonial Exposition, although only after accepting many modifications suggested by the jury.

Bazin collaborated on many of Laprade's projects. These included the garage on Rue Marbeuf, which won much praise internationally, the Écho du Nord building in Lille and the Palais de la Porte Dorée for the 1931 Colonial Exhibition. Louis Bouquet created a painting named Souvenir du Musée des Colonies that depicts the men who worked on the Palais de la Porte Dorée: Laprade and Bazin, Bouquet himself, the sculptor Alfred Janniot and the interior decorator Jacques-Émile Ruhlmann. The painting also includes an anonymous black woman wearing only a skirt, resembling Josephine Baker, who represents the indigenous colonial people.

Bazin worked with Laprade on the competition for the Génissiat Dam. Bazin left Leprade in 1936 to form his own agency. However, Laprade and Bazin worked together to design the Peace Monument in the Place du Trocadero for the 1937 Exposition Internationale des Arts et Techniques dans la Vie Moderne. They also collaborated on the pavilion for diffusion of the French language and the pavilion and garden of Iraq.

Bazin was appointed chief architect for reconstruction of the Loiret department in 1941. After the liberation of France in 1944 he was reappointed to this position, and in 1950 became consulting architect to Loiret and Loir-et-Cher. In 1947 he became consultant architect for Électricité de France and the Compagnie Nationale du Rhône and in this role undertook a number of power plants. He was appointed chief architect of civilian buildings and national monuments in 1959, and was attached to the Museum of African and Oceanic Art at the Palais de la Porte Dorée he had helped to build with Laprade. Following Louis Arretche he worked on the reconstruction of Saint-Malo, the housing estate at Melun and the new city of Orléans-La Source.

Léon-Emile Bazin died in Paris in 1976 .

== Works ==
Solo projects are listed below. He also worked with Albert Laprade on many projects in the 1930s.

- 1946-1947: creation of the "Maison Grames" in the experimental subdivision "Cité de Merlan" in Noisy-le-Sec, Seine-Saint-Denis (House with steel structure and steel panels)
- 1957: development of the area around the hydroelectric plant of Montélimar for the Compagnie Nationale du Rhône
- 1957: Building at 57 Avenue Reille in the 14th arrondissement of Paris
- 1959-1968: quarter of the Gare d'Orléans (administrative center, Pasteur housing complex and Chapel)
- 1962-1976: chief architect of the priority development area of Almont in Melun, Seine-et-Marne (3129 units)
- 1968: Development of the chute of the power station at Bourg-lès-Valence for the Compagnie Nationale du Rhône
- 1973: Building of the Department of Studies and Research of EDF in Clamart, Hauts-de-Seine
