= Compagnie Nationale du Rhône =

French electricity generation company

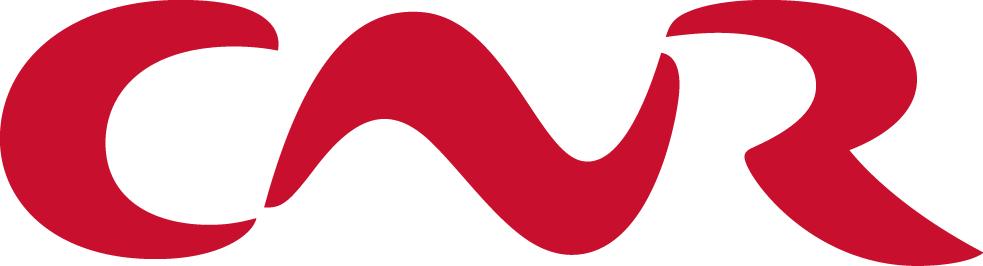
- Industry: Power generation
- Founded: 1933
- Headquarters: Lyon, France
- Key people: Elisabeth Ayrault (Chairwoman of the Management Board and Chief Executive Officer) - Thierry Saegeman (Managing Director) - Julien Français (Managing Director)
- Products: Electricity
- Revenue: €1.09 billion (2015)
- Number of employees: 1,372 (2015)
- Website: cnr.tm.fr/fr

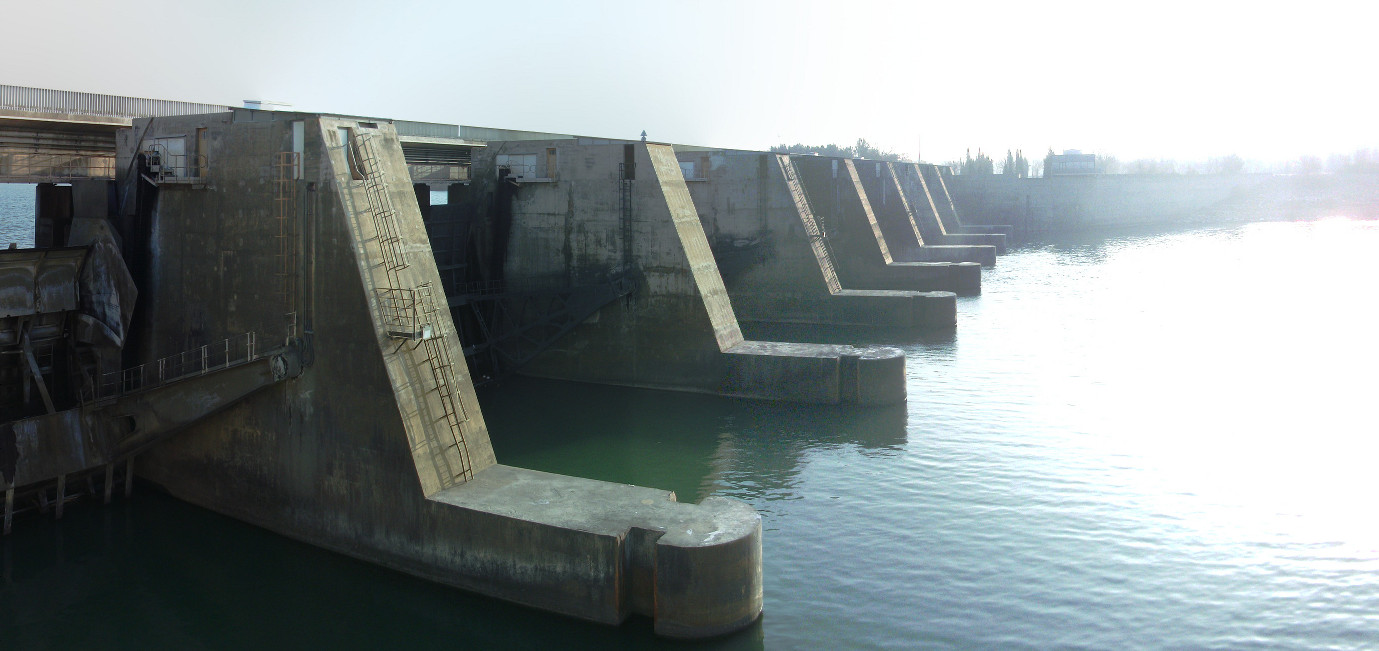
North part of the Caderousse dam on the Rhône river

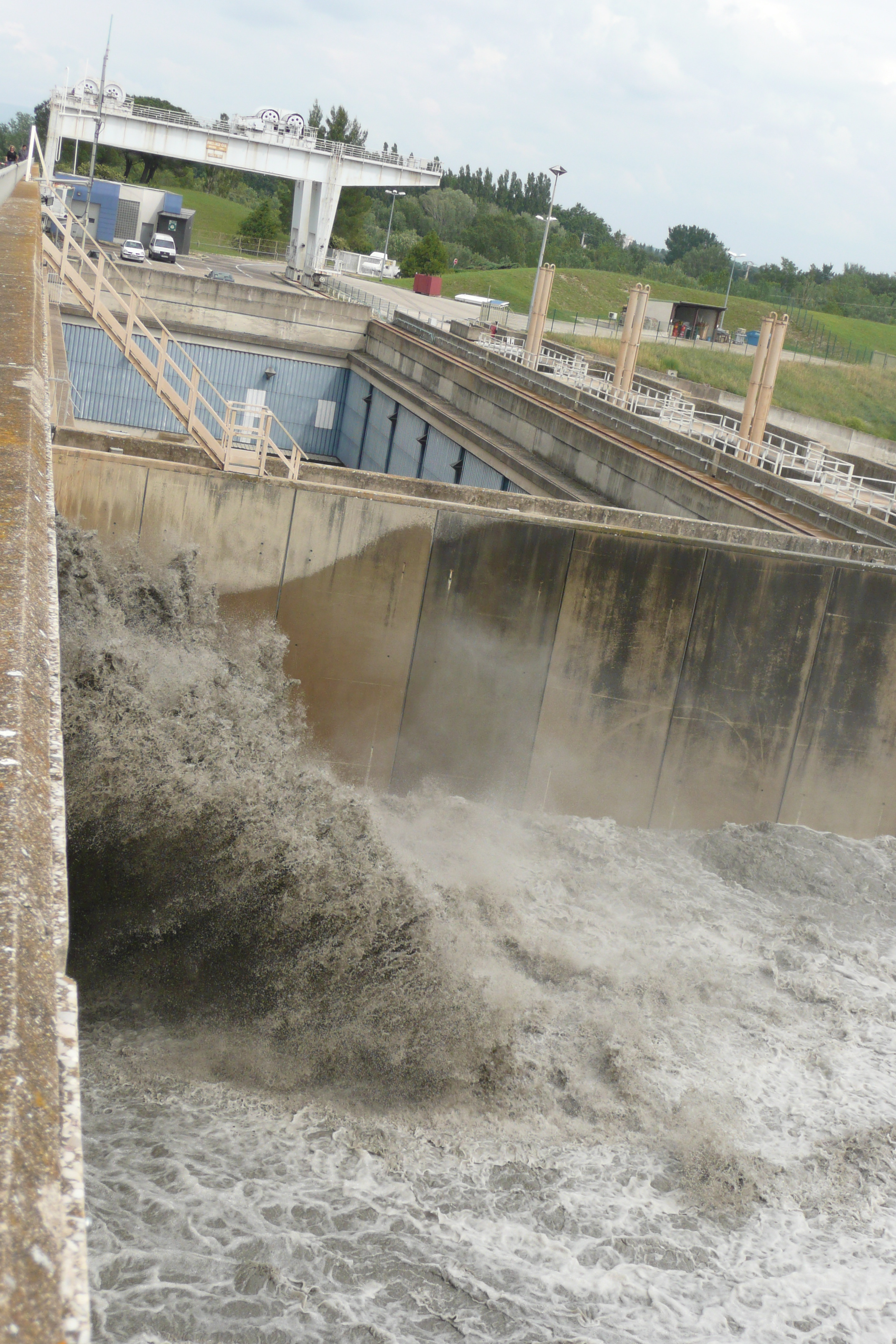
Avignon facility

The Compagnie Nationale du Rhône (French pronunciation: [kɔ̃paɲi nɑsjɔnal dy ʁon]; CNR) is a French electricity generation company, mainly supplying renewable power from hydroelectric facilities on the Rhône.

== Operations ==
Established in 1933, as of 2009 the company derives most of its power from 19 major dams on the Rhone River with associated power stations, for which it has a concession until 2023. The company also has wind and solar power farms. This company has been totally independent of Électricité de France (EDF) since 2002, and is EDF's main competitor in the French electricity market. Its production averages 14.4 billion TWh per year, a quarter of the national hydropower and 3% of French electricity production.

Since its inception, the company was entrusted by the State to develop and operate the Rhone, with three important goals: power generation, navigation, irrigation and other agricultural uses. The Génissiat, Donzère-Mondragon, Beauchastel, Montélimar, Seyssel and Chautagne dams, previously operated by EDF, are the main facilities.

== Shareholding ==
France implemented directives to open the electricity market to competition in the early 2000s, but by law the French state had to retain a majority stake in CNR. The Caisse des dépôts et consignations holds 33.20% of shares, and 16.83% are held by various local communities, totaling 50.03%. Electrabel, a subsidiary of ENGIE, acquired the remaining 49.97%. The European Commission found that GDF Suez had effectively controlled CNR since December 2003 due to the dilution of public ownership among the different communities and their lack of participation at general meetings. Electrabel was fined 20 million euros for not having warned the European Commission about the effect of the acquisition.

== History ==
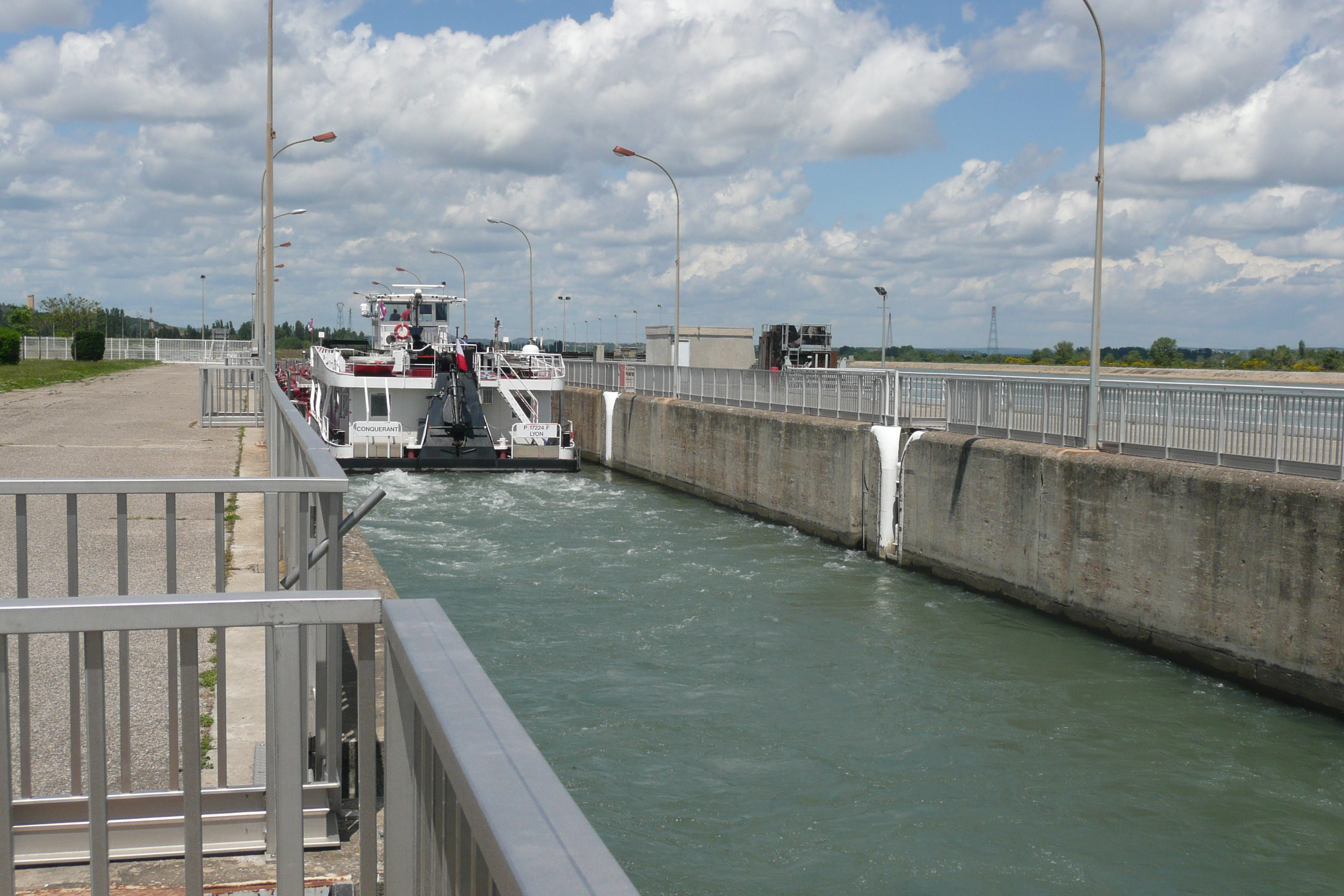
Lock at Beaucaire, Gard

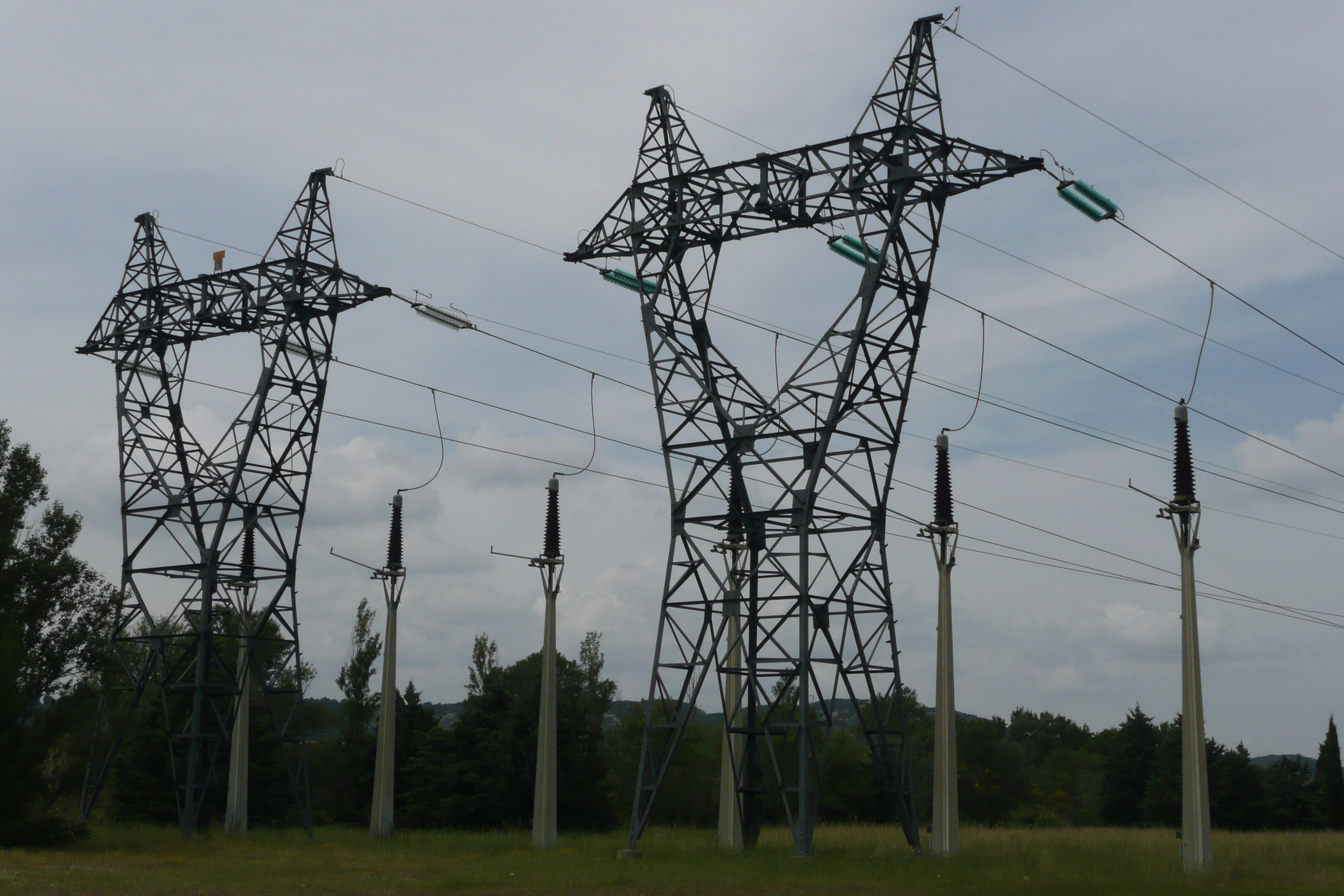
High tension lines at Avignon

Key events in the history of the company:

- 1899: On the initiative of the Chamber of Commerce of Lyon, 27 representatives of chambers of commerce in the region voted in favor of developing the Rhone for the three purposes of navigation, irrigation and the use of the driving force. They asked for state funding.
- 1921: On 27 May the Organic Law of the CNR was published in the Official Journal. The development of the Rhône must comply with the three purposes, which are inseparable.
- 1933: On 27 May the CNR held its formative general assembly. The capital was divided into four equal groups. The first (A) was wholly owned by the City of Paris. The second (B) by 251 shareholders, local communities in the region interested in development. The third (C) by the PLM. Finally, the fourth (D), by the major industrial energy companies of the time, including Giros-Loucheur, Azaria, Empain, Mercier and Durand.
- 1934: The state granted the CNR a 27,000 hectares (67,000 acres) concession for the Rhone with a term of 99 years.
- 1935: Start of construction of the port of Lyon (later Port Edouard Herriot).
- 1937: Start of construction of the first dam on the Rhone, the Génissiat Dam.
- 1946: CNR narrowly escaped the nationalization of the electricity sector. Following the intervention of Léon Perrier and Édouard Herriot, Article 41 of the nationalization law said a special law to be passed before 31 December 1946 would determine the conditions for liquidation of the CNR.
- 1948: CNR and EDF make an initial financial agreement during the commissioning of the Génissiat plant and dam.
- 1965: The mission of the CNR is redefined in the context of planning policy.
- 1980: End of development of the Lower Rhone (Vaugris) and law on the Rhine-Rhone link.
- 1986: End of the development of the Upper Rhone Sault Brénaz Dam.
- 1997: On 19 June, abandonment of the Rhine-Rhone project.
- 2000: Act of 10 February on the modernization and development of the public electricity service.
- 2001: 28 March – report of Michel Gentot allows the CNR to regain ownership of its production facilities. 1 April: CNR can freely market its electricity. 11 December: The Murcef law confirms the status of majority public ownership of CNR.
- 2003: Publication of decrees relating to the modernization of the concession and the implementation of laws; entry of Electrabel into the capital.
- 2006: CNR alone operates the Rhone facilities.

== Facilities ==
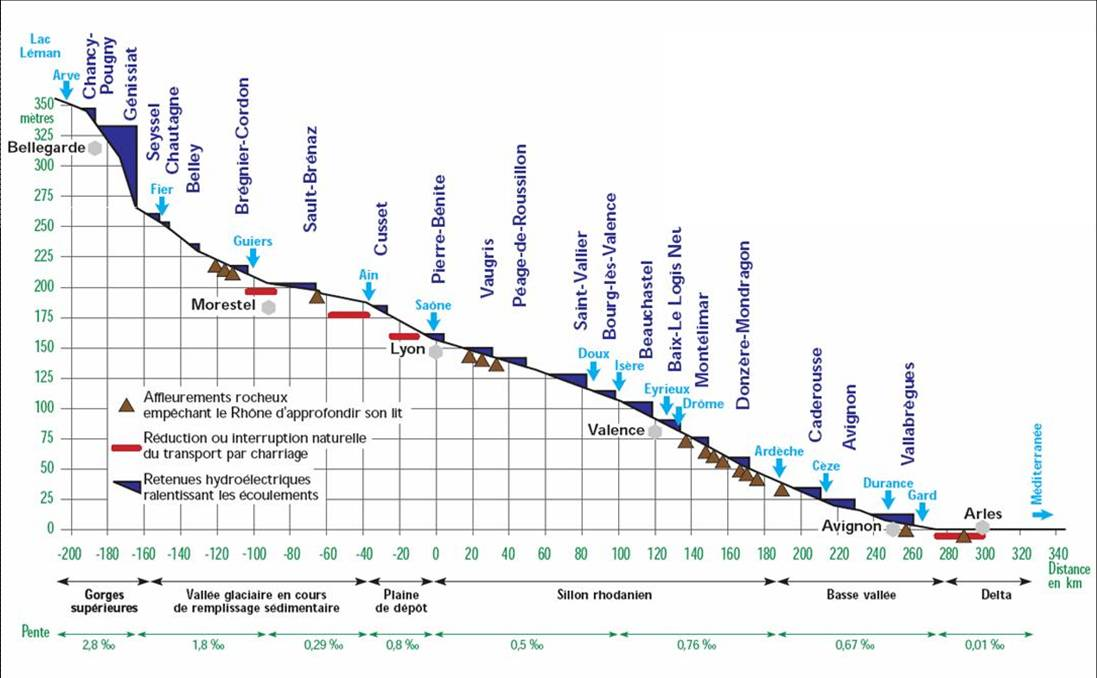
Profile of the Rhône with its different dams

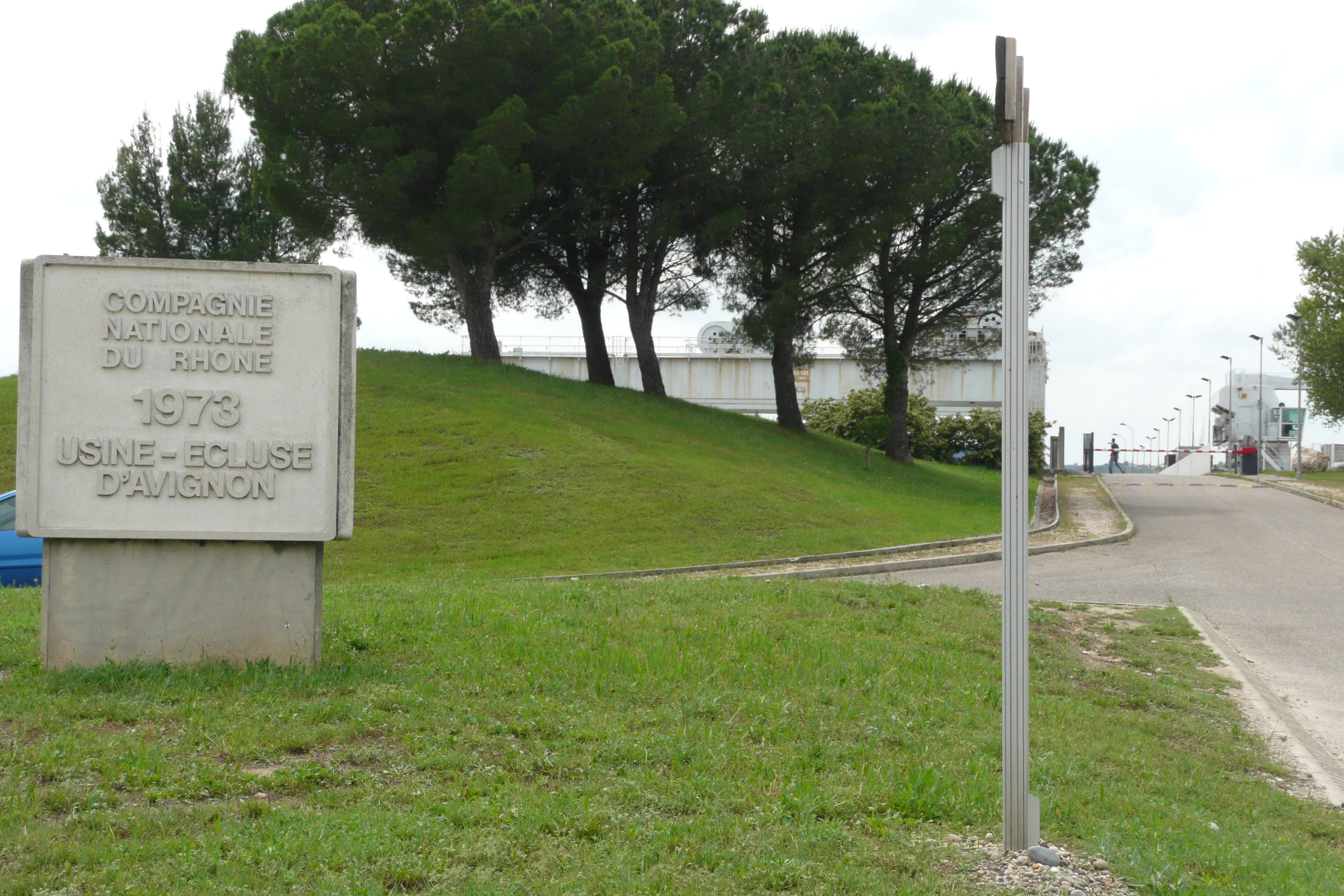
Lock and power station at Avignon

As of 31 December 2015 the facilities were:

- 19 dams: Génissiat, Seyssel, Motz, Lavours, Champagneux, Villebois, Pierre-Bénite, Reventin-Vaugris, Saint-Pierre-de-Bœuf, Arras-sur-Rhône, Bourg-lès-Valence, Charmes, Le Pouzin, Châteauneuf-du-Rhône, Bollène, Caderousse, Avignon, Sauveterre and Beaucaire
- 19 hydroelectric stations: Génissiat, Seyssel, Anglefort, Brens-Virignin, Brégnier-Cordon, Sault-Brénaz, Pierre-Bénite, Reventin-Vaugris, Sablons, Gervans, Bourg-lès-Valence, Beauchastel, Le Logis Neuf, Châteauneuf-du-Rhône, Bollène, Caderousse, Avignon, Sauveterre, Beaucaire
- 1 dam in co-operation: Chancy-Pougny
- 21 small hydro plants and mini-plants
- 32 wind farms
- 14 photovoltaic power plants
- 14 wide gauge locks
- 5 pleasure craft locks
- 400 kilometres (250 mi) of dikes
- 32 pumping stations
- 330 kilometres (210 mi) of wide gauge navigable waterways
- 27,000 hectares (67,000 acres) concession, including 14,000 hectares (35,000 acres) of river
- 27 industrial and port sites including the port of Lyon .

== Production ==
Installed capacity as of 31 December 2015 is 3,464 MW:

- Hydraulic 3,035 MW
- Wind: 382 MW
- Photovoltaic: 47 MWc

Average annual production: 14.4 TWh.
