= Albert Laprade =

French architect (1883-1978)

- Born: 29 November 1883; Buzançais, France
- Died: 9 May 1978 (aged 94); Paris, France
- Occupation: Architect
- Known for: Palais de la Porte Dorée; Prefecture of Paris; Génissiat Dam

Albert Laprade (29 November 1883 – 9 May 1978) was a French architect, perhaps best known for the Palais de la Porte Dorée. During a long career he undertook many urban renewal projects as well as major industrial and commercial works. A skilled artist, he published a series of sketch books of architecture in France and other Mediterranean countries.

== Biography ==
=== Birth and education ===
Albert Laprade was born in Buzançais, Indre on 29 November 1883. He was the only son of a wholesale grocer and a seamstress from Châteauroux. He attended the Lycée Jean-Giraudoux in Châteauroux, graduating in 1900. He then moved to Paris where his maternal uncle Ernest Cléret, an architect and professor at the Gobelins Manufactory, encouraged him to study for admission to the École nationale supérieure des Beaux-Arts. In 1905 he was admitted to the studio of Gaston Redon, and then studied under Albert Tournaire. He was a brilliant pupil and won many prizes. He obtained his diploma as an architect in 1907.

=== Early career ===
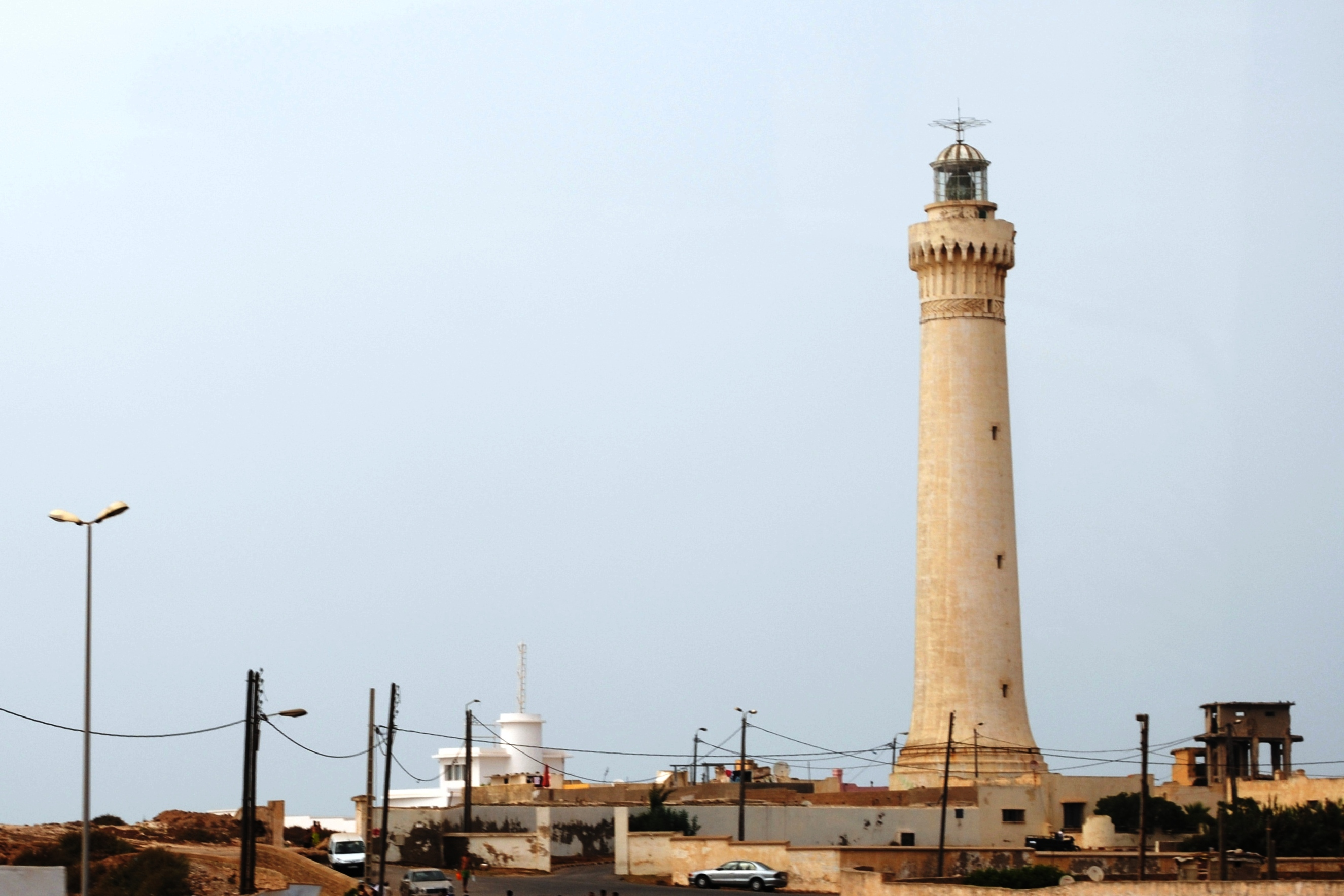
El Hank lighthouse, Casablanca, which Laprade and Prost designed in 1916.

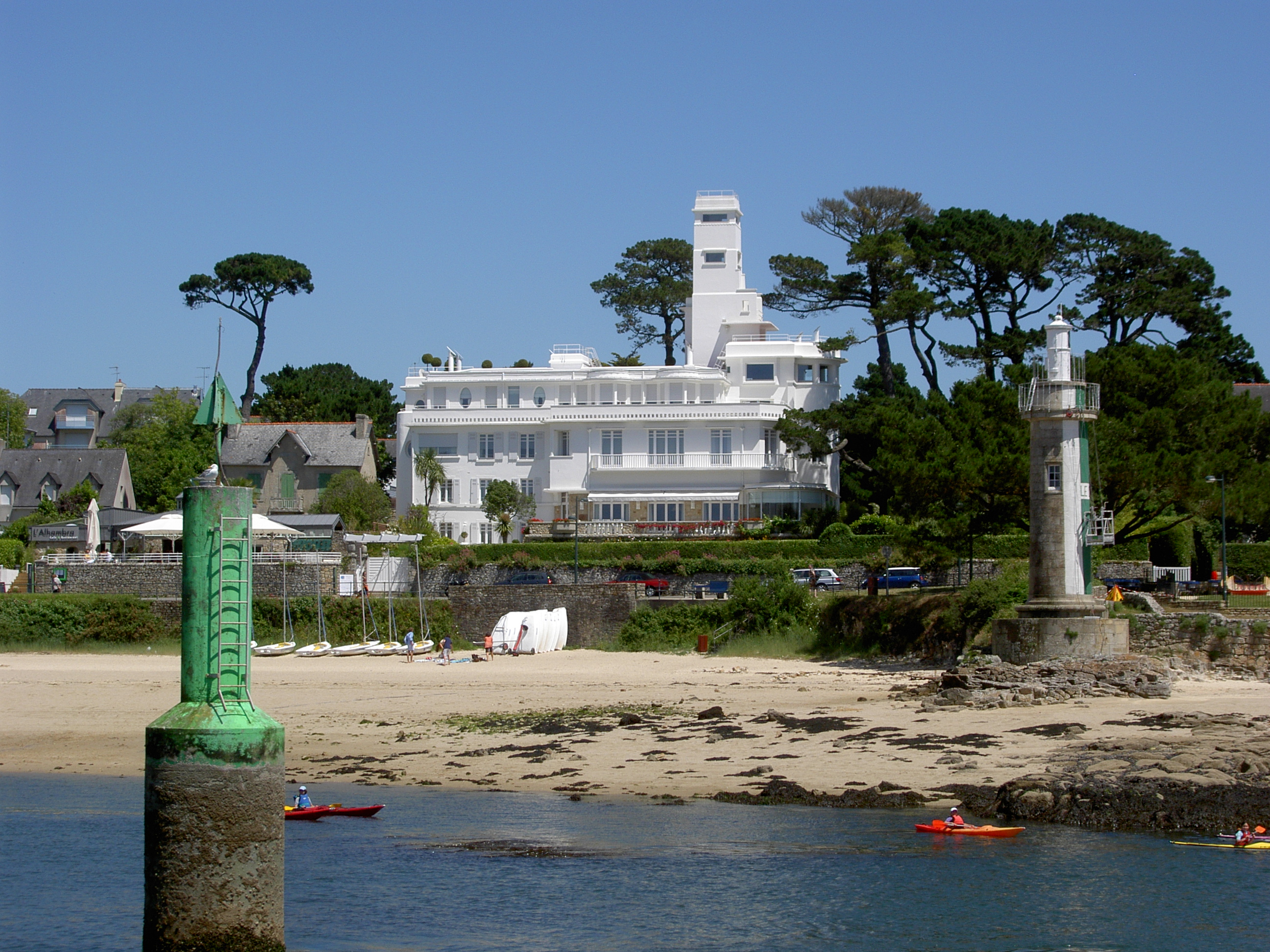
Villa Magdalena, Bénodet, Brittany (1926-1928)

Between 1910 and 1914 Laprade worked in the studio of René Sergent, an uncle by marriage, who designed townhouses and chateaux lavishly decorated in the Louis XV style. He also worked with Henri Prost. He was called up in 1914 with the outbreak of World War I (1914-1918). In 1915 he was wounded at Ypres and sent to Rouen to recover, but was unable to return to the field. Prost arranged for him to become his assistant in Morocco.

Laprade worked under Prost in the town planning division, and was given the tasks of redesigning the great central park in Casablanca, and then planning a new indigenous town. Laprade first made many drawings of local architectural motifs in an effort to understand the interaction of stylistic elements with social functions. His goal was to develop an elegant urban architecture based on modern technology that would be appropriate to the stylistic tastes and way of life of the Moroccan people. His new Madina in Casablanca was separate from the French quarters and very different in design. Laprade followed Moroccan traditions in the division between interior courtyards and the street. His new quarter, in neo-Moorish style using modern materials, technology and sanitary principles, included pedestrian walkways, courtyard houses, markets, communal ovens, mosques, schools and public baths.

In 1917 Laprade went to Rabat where he assisted with the General Residence and its gardens, the military and diplomatic cabinet, a park and sports ground, and the Marshal's residence. In this last he incorporated concepts from local architecture, ensuring harmony with the surrounding buildings. Auguste Cadet and Edmond Brion undertook the madina construction project in Casablanca, which started in 1919 and continued for many years. Laprade met many of his future private clients while in Morocco. His sketches of local gardens and houses were later used to illustrate Jean Galotti's Les Jardins et les maisons arabes au Maroc (1926).

Laprade returned to France in 1920. That year he rebuilt the Château de Gerbéviller, which had been damaged by bombing, for Charles de Lambertye-Gerbéviller. Laprade created the Jardins des Nympheas and Jardins des Oiseaux for the 1925 International Exposition of Modern Industrial and Decorative Arts in Paris. In an interview he said that he had a love of flowers embedded in architecture, whether it was brick, stone or even concrete. His Art Deco parterres were laid out in geometrical patterns, with monochromatic masses of plants and alternating beds of flowers in pastel colors. In 1925 he formed a partnership with Léon Bazin that lasted until 1936. Laprade was a founding member of the Society of Modern Artists (1925) and of the International Union of Architects.

=== 1930s ===
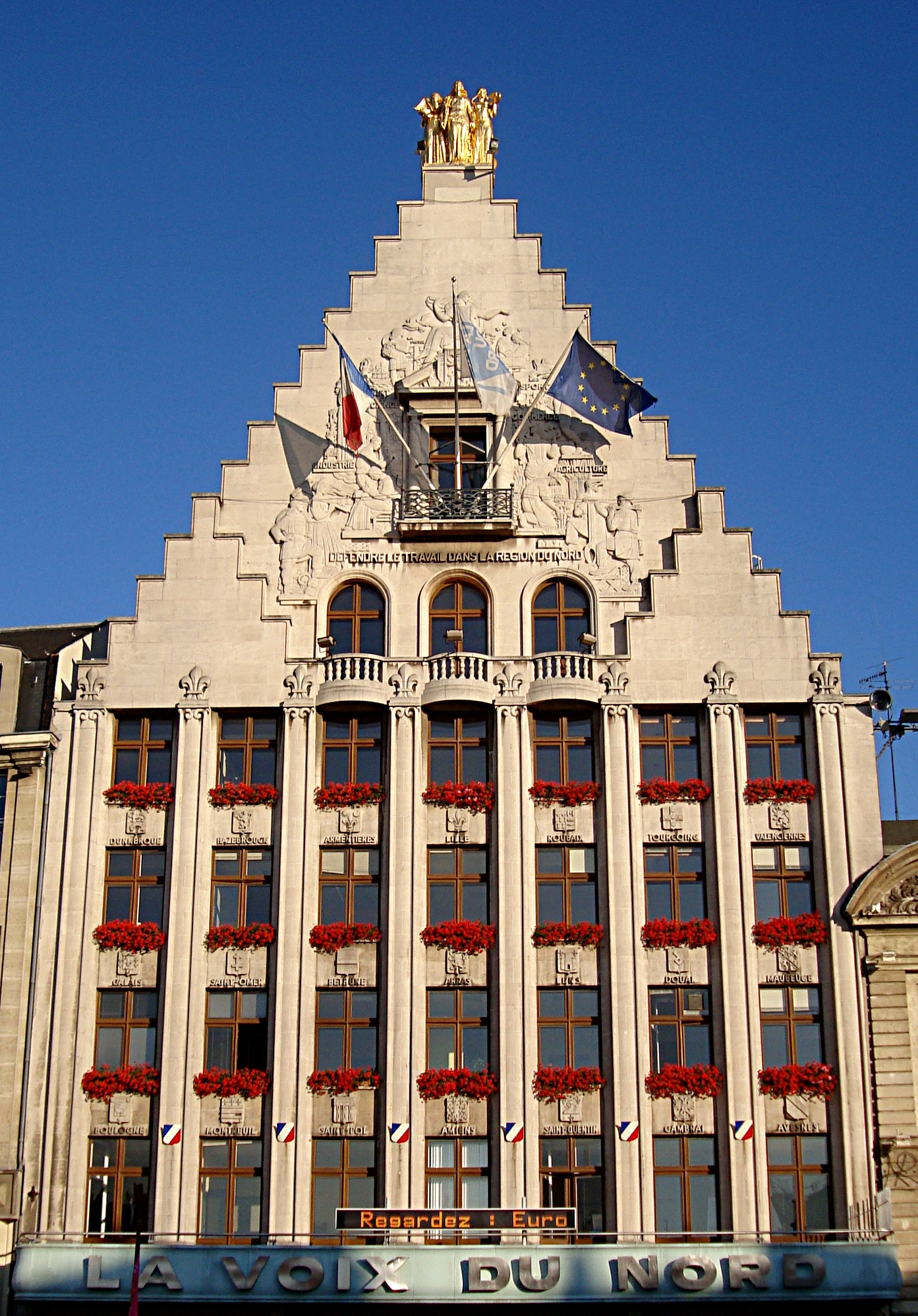
Façade of the Voix du Nord building in Lille (1936), following the local tradition of crow-stepped gables.

For the 1931 Paris Colonial Exposition Laprade collaborated with Léon Jaussely in building the permanent Palace of the Colonies, the Palais de la Porte Dorée. The sculptor Alfred Janniot decorated the facade. Laprade saw his challenge as being "to evoke far off countries while remaining in harmony with the atmosphere of Paris." His solution was a "simple, noble, very calm, very neutral" building, covered with "a great tapestry of stone in warm tonalities ... a tapestry sheltered by a sort of light canopy, evoking the countries of the sun in a neutral and modern note." Jacques-Émile Ruhlmann furnished the Salon d'Afrique at one end of the main facade, and Eugène Printz furnished the Salon de l'Asie at the other end. Louis Bouquet painted the frescoes in one of the rooms. Bouquet created a painting named Souvenir du Musée des Colonies that depicts the men who worked on the pavilion: Laprade and Bazin, Janniot, Bouquet and Ruhlmann. The painting also includes an anonymous black woman wearing only a skirt, resembling Josephine Baker, who represents the indigenous colonial people.

Laprade and Robert Fournez were the architects for the exhibition's Morocco pavilion, which evoked the palaces of Fez and Marrakesh. The interior held a labyrinth of small rooms with different exhibits, leading to a long narrow garden with souqs on each side where visitors could buy Moroccan handicrafts at the stalls. The novelist Pierre Mille wrote of the pavilion, "Morocco: here the building is more than a copy: a hybridization of styles recently created by our architects and of the Moroccan style."

Laprade was chief architect of Civilian Buildings and National Palaces (BCPN) from 1932 to 1960. In 1932 he was appointed General Inspector of Art Education. He defined reforms to education in the 1930s and 1940s in which he emphasized the critical importance of teaching drawing skills in secondary schools, since this was an essential tool for both artists and craftsmen. Industrial progress depended on new designs, and designers needed drawing skills. Laprade was part of the editorial board, and one of the contributors of the avant garde urban planning magazines Plans (1930-1932), then Prelude (1932-1936), with Hubert Lagardelle, Pierre Winter, Charles Trochu, Philippe Lamour, François de Pierrefeu, Le Corbusier and Marcel Martiny.

Léon Bazin left Leprade in 1936 to form his own agency. Laprade was then associated with B. Philippe and J. Vernon until 1947, and then with Claude Barré until his death in 1978. Laprade and Bazin designed the Peace Monument in the Place du Trocadero for the 1937 Exposition Internationale des Arts et Techniques dans la Vie Moderne. They also collaborated on the pavilion for diffusion of the French language and the pavilion and garden of Iraq Edmond Labbé, who was responsible for the exhibition, deliberately emphasized regionalism. Laprade, as a socialist, had mixed views about the result. He said it was,

the true reflection of the state of mind of 1937 ... For the last five years, each nation living in autocracy, distances itself from the universal, the European, and has begun to cultivate its own backyard, each province receiving equal attention. The result is worrisome on the political level but full of interest on the artistic one. International cubism is clearly being discarded in order to renew ties with national and provincial traditions.

=== Later career ===
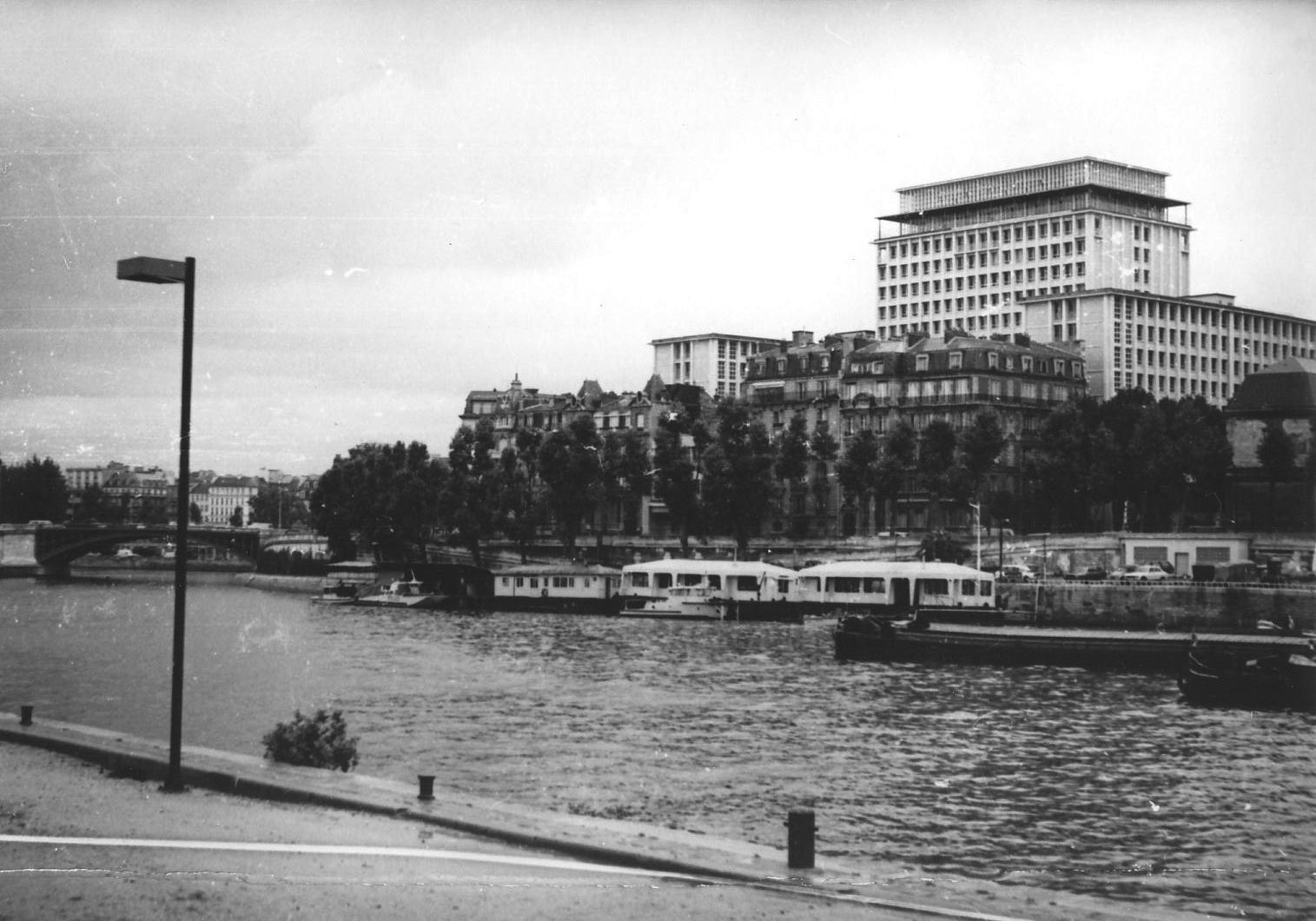
Paris, 4th arrondissement, quai Henri IV, seen from the quai Saint-Bernard, in 1981. The 14-story building to the rear in the right of the picture is the Prefecture.

After the 1930s Laprade began to undertake fewer private commissions and became more interested in urban planning and restoration. He spent the years of World War II (1939-1945) organizing his notes and drawings from his travels, from which his famous albums would be drawn. Laprade was inspector General of Beaux-Arts from 1943 to 1952. After the war Laprade was appointed Chief Architect of the Ministry of Reconstruction and Development (North). From 1944 to 1949 Laprade was in charge of protecting and improving area of the 4th arrondissement of Paris around the Église Saint-Gervais.

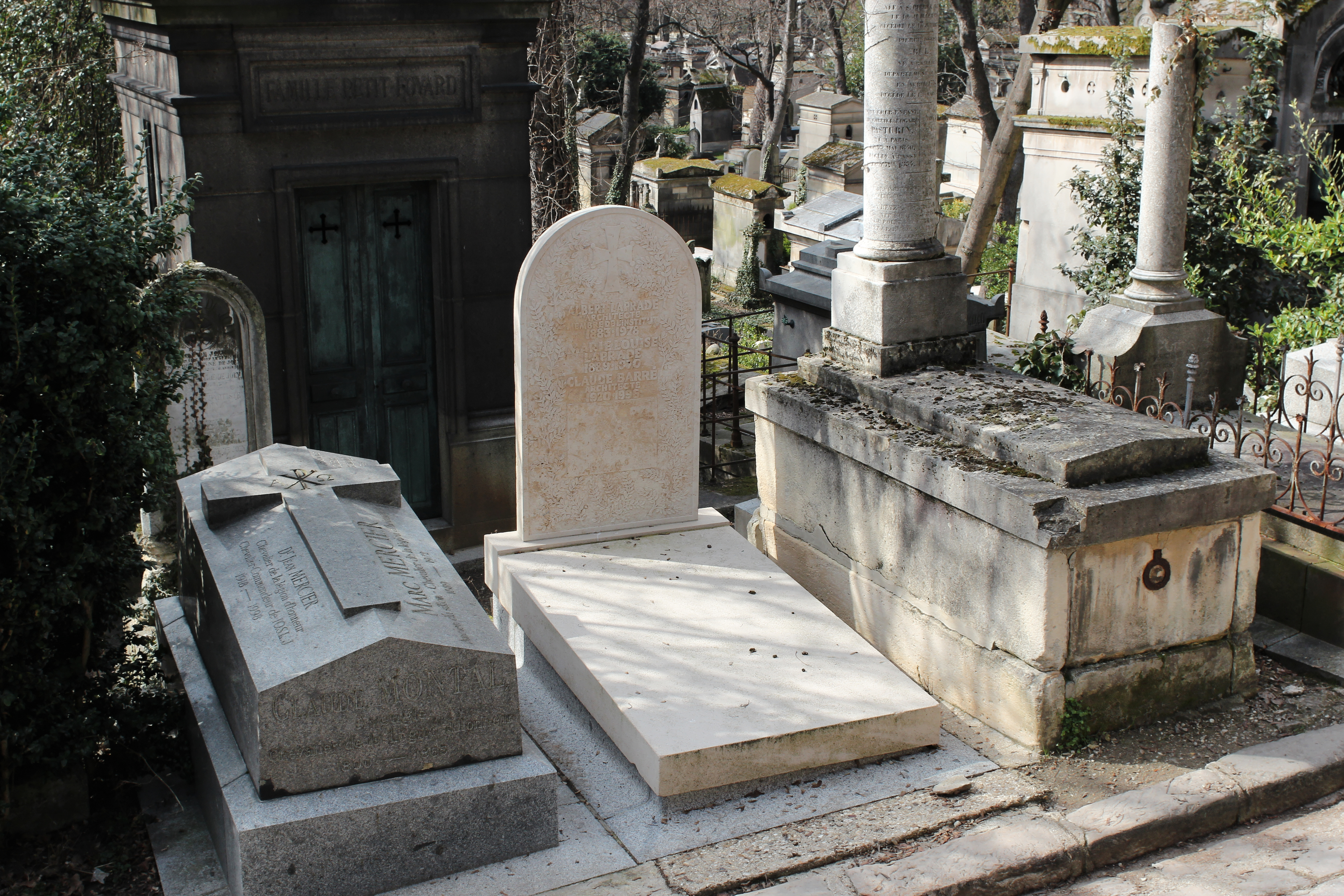
Laprade's grave at the Père Lachaise Cemetery in Paris.

Laprade was architect for the reconstruction of the old towns of Le Mans and Alençon. In 1959 he attended the first international congress on restoration of historic towns and was surprised to find that exemplary work was being done by socialist states. It was not until 1962 that the concept of protected areas found its way into French legislature. From 1950 to 1962 he was consulting architect to the Schneider Electric facilities at Le Creusot. From 1945 to 1965 he was a member of the Committee on Parisian sites. From 1955 to 1970 he was responsible for supervision of the banks of the Seine with Claude Charpentier.

Albert Laprade was made a Commander of the Legion of Honour. In 1963 he was elected a member of the Royal Academy of Belgium. Albert Laprade died in Paris on 9 May 1978.

== Works ==
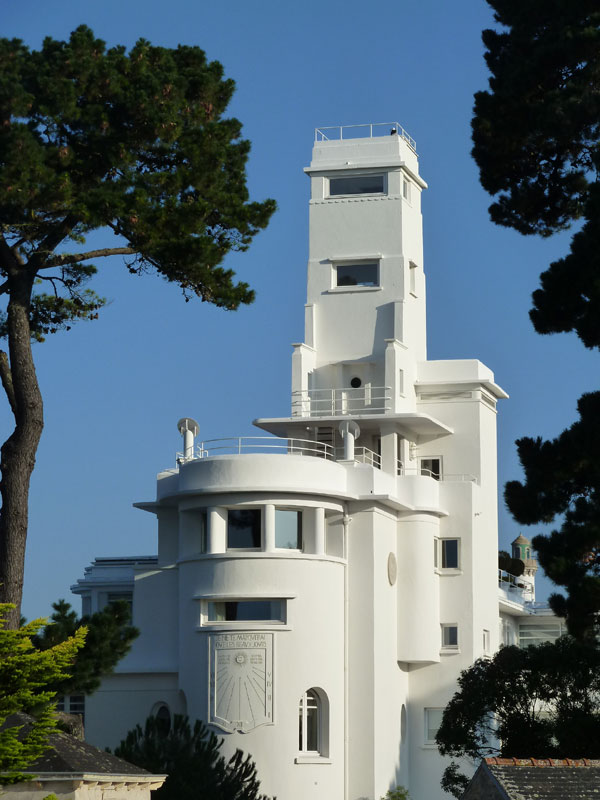
Villa Magdalena, today the Hôtel le Minare, Bénodet, Brittany (1926-1928)

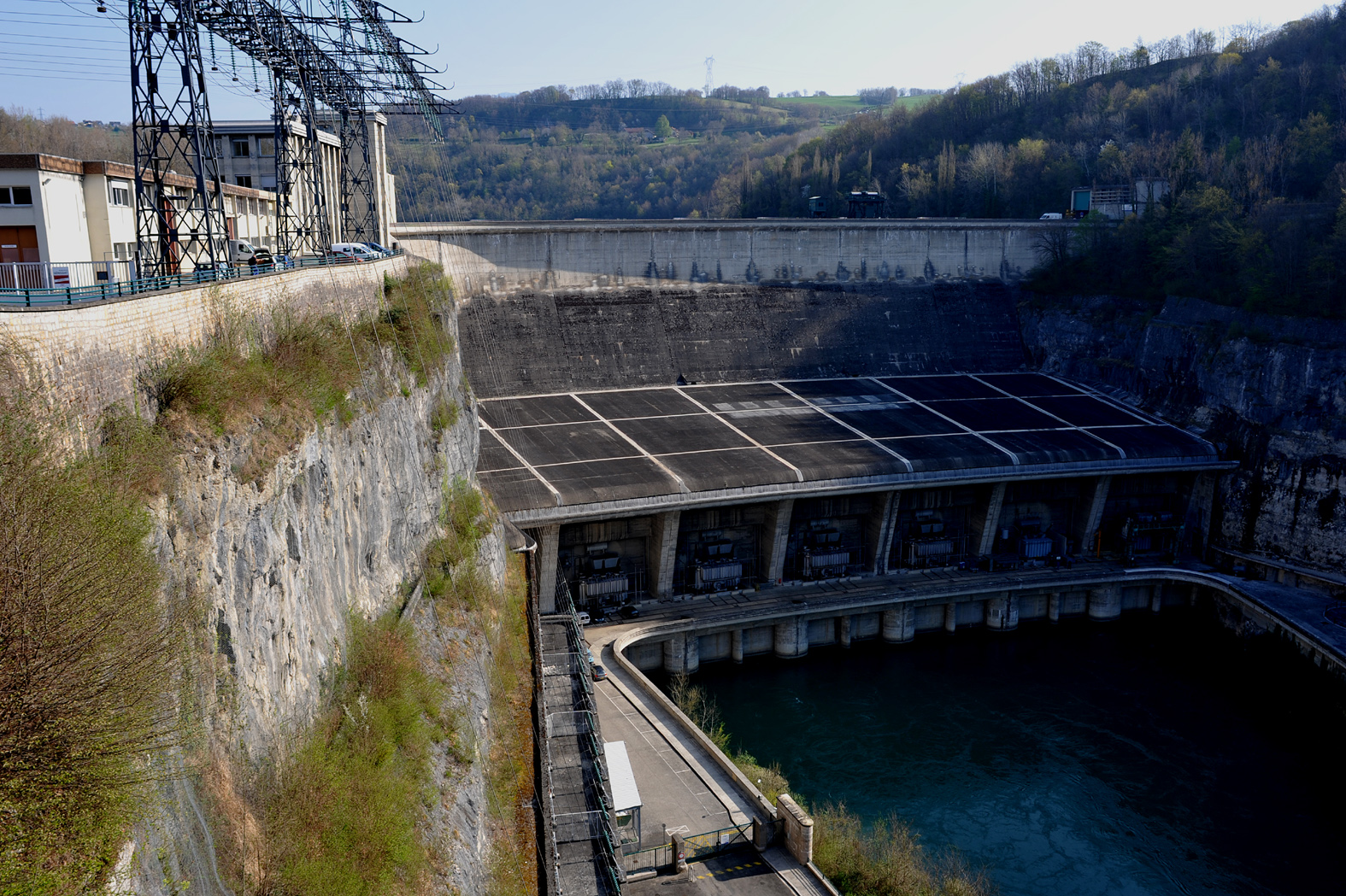
Génissiat dam on the Rhône (1939-1950)

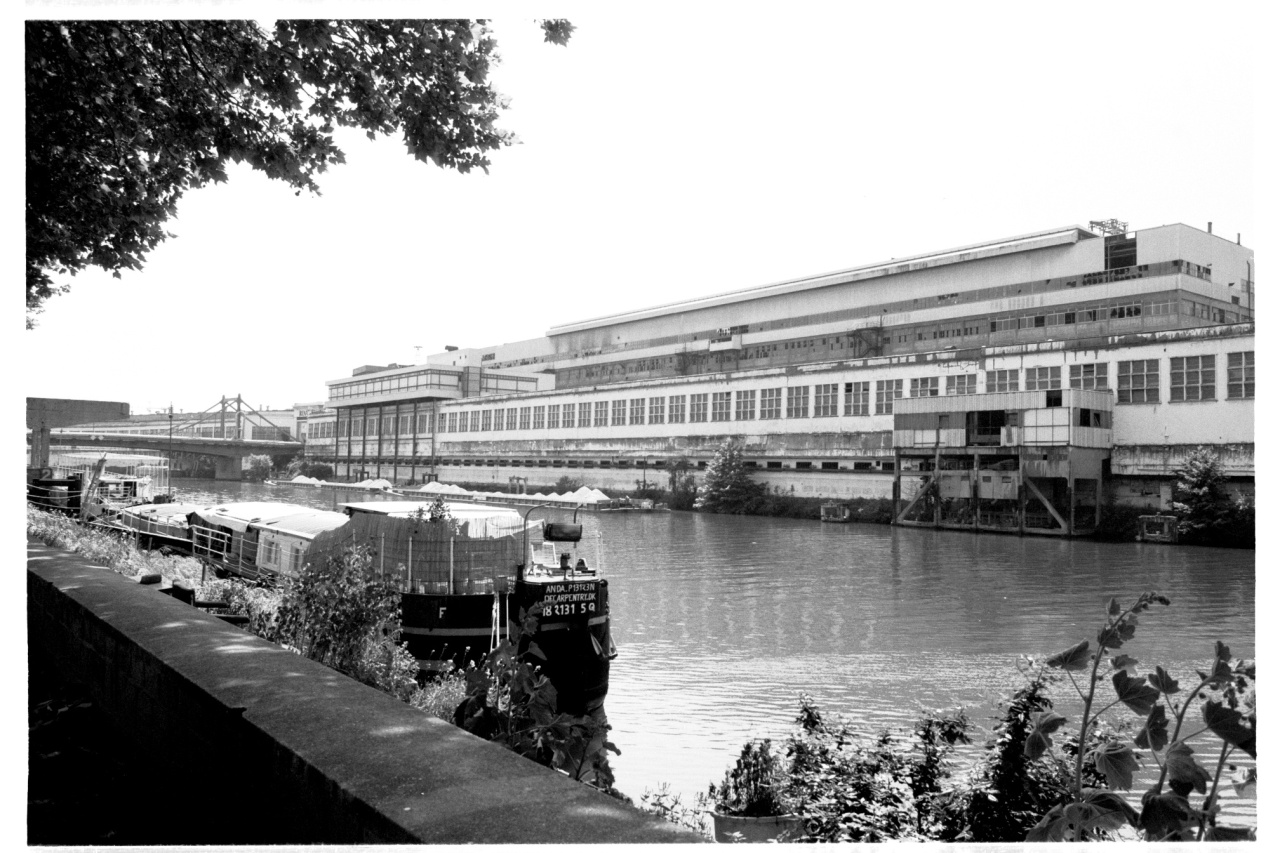
Renault factories on Seguin island at Boulogne-Billancourt (1944-1951)

Laprade's work reflected many of the changes in 20th-century architecture during his long career, but he always remained true to the principles of aesthetics, balance and proportion. He and other architects of his time struggled with the challenge of building modern structures in Paris without destroying the harmony of the city's architecture. In 1931 he created a series of photomontages that illustrated the problem, showing skyscrapers emerging from among 19th-century buildings.

Laprade also had to deal with the issue of how much the French should adapt to indigenous styles in the colonies. In 1928 Laprade described the new architectural style that was emerging in Morocco as a "synthesis of our Latin spirit and love for autochthonous art". Laprade saw the architect's goal as integrating "values of ambience" with a "whole way of life". He thought that architecture was alive, and "should express a sentiment."

Laprade believed in variety and complexity of the urban environment rather than uniformity, and was opposed to vandalism in the name of development of old quarters. He followed both traditional and modern styles. In some of his urban development work such as in Gournay-en-Bray (1942) and the old center of Le Mans he used a picturesque style. He used modern designs for commercial and industrial projects, which included the Citroën garage, rue Marbeuf (1928), Génissiat dam on the Rhône (1939-1950), Roselend dam at La Bâthie (1954-1961) and the development of the Renault factories on Seguin island at Boulogne-Billancourt (1944-1951).

Selected works:

- 1916 El Hank lighthouse, Casablanca, with Henri Prost
- 1916-1921: Parc Lyautey, Casablanca, with Henri Porst
- 1918-1924: French Protectorate Residence, Rabat
- 1920: Reconstruction of the Château de Gerbéviller
- 1924: Restoration of the Château de la Chaise
- 1925: Jardins des Nympheas and Jardins des Oiseaux for the 1925 International Exposition des Arts Décoratifs et Industriels Modernes in Paris
- 1925-1929: works for a fertilizer factory, Berry-Bouy
- 1925-1930: the Marquise Maurigi Villa, Port Cors
- 1926-1928: Villa Magdalena and garden, Bénodet, Brittany
- 1927 Villa Dardiali, Pyla-sur-Mer
- 1931: Pavilion for French overseas territories in the Paris Colonial Exhibition, the Palais de la Porte Dorée, which now houses the Cité nationale de l'histoire de l'immigration
- 1932: Foundation of Abreu Grancher in the Student Village Cité Internationale Universitaire de Paris
- 1933-1935: Workers' settlement in Colombe
- 1933-1937 French Embassy in Ankara, with Léon Bazin
- 1935: Monument for Hubert Lyautey, Casablanca
- 1936: La Voix du Nord newspaper building, Lille.
- 1937: Iraqi pavilion at the World Exhibition in Paris
- 1939: Villa Prince Murat, Fédala (Mohammedia), Morocco. Built for prince Charles Murat (16 June 1892 - 24 November 1973). Destroyed in June 2013.
- 1941: Place d'Armes, Valenciennes
- 1947: Seyssel Dam
- 1945-1960: Civic Center in Lille, with other architects
- 1949-1951: Lucien Paye Residence, Cité Internationale Universitaire de Paris, in collaboration with Jean Vernon and Bruno Philippe
- 1949-1953 House of Morocco, Cité Internationale Universitaire de Paris, in collaboration with Jean Vernon and Bruno Philippe
- 1950-1962: Workers settlement in Le Creusot
- 1951-1954: Memorial for Jean Giraudoux, Bellac
- 1955-1966: Civic Center in the 4th arrondissement of Paris, including the Paris Prefecture
- Compagnie parisienne d'électricité at 76 rue de Rennes.
- 1957 Monument to Victor Hugo, Paris
- 1959-1964: Archives de la Seine, Paris, with René Fontaine
- 1963: tomb of Hubert Lyautey, Les Invalides, Paris
- 1965: Hilton Hotel, Orly

== Publications ==
Laprade was an excellent draftsman and watercolorist, interested in traditional architecture and landscape gardening. He published several collections of drawings that he had made as Inspector or Inspector General of Fine Arts.

- Gallotti, Jean (1926). Le Jardin et la Maison arabes au Maroc: Avec 160 dessins de Albert Laprade et 136 planches en héliogravure d'après les photographies de Lucien Vogel, Félix, Vve P. R. Schmitt, G. Fauré et Canu. Albert Lévy.
- Laprade, Albert (1952). Croquis. Europe Méridionale Et Asie Mineure.
- Laprade, Albert (1958). Croquis. Portugal, Espagne, Maroc.
- Laprade, Albert (1974). Croquis. Serg.
- Laprade, Albert (1974). Croquis Paris: quartiers du centre, les Halles, le Marais. J. Fréal.
- Laprade, Albert (1974). Croquis, 3e album: region du midi. J. Freal.
- Laprade, Albert (1977). Croquis: Région du Midi. Troisième album. Serg. ISBN 978-2-85869-024-4.
- Bezombes, Roger (1983). Architectures de la Méditerranée à travers les croquis d'Albert Laprade. Berger-Levrault. ISBN 9782701305486.
- Laprade, Albert (2006). Les carnets d'architecture d'Albert Laprade. Kubik éditions. ISBN 978-2-35083-017-9.

He also published a number of other works:

- Laprade, Albert (1932). Idées générales sur le jardin moderne.
- Laprade, Albert (1934). Lyautey urbaniste: souvenirs d'un témoin. Horizons de France.
- Laprade, Albert (1937). Depuis le paradis jusqu'à Versailles.
- Laprade, Albert (1949). La Collaboration des ingénieurs et des architectes dans les grands travaux publics et industriels. impr. de Arrault.
- Laprade, Albert (1954). François d'Orbay: 1634-1697.
- Laprade, Albert (1957). Les architectes. S.A.D.G., Société des Architectes Diplomés par le Gouvernement.
- Laprade, Albert (1957). Aménagement des quartiers historiques.
- Laprade, Albert; Bourdel, Nicole; Lafond, Jean (1960). François d'Orbay: architecte de Louis XIV. Vincent, Fréal et Cie (Bar-sur-Aube, impr. Lebois).
- Chevalier, Jacques; Laprade, Albert (1972). La Sculpture sur bois: le métier ... Baillière.
