= Génissiat Dam =

Dam in Injoux-Génissiat, France

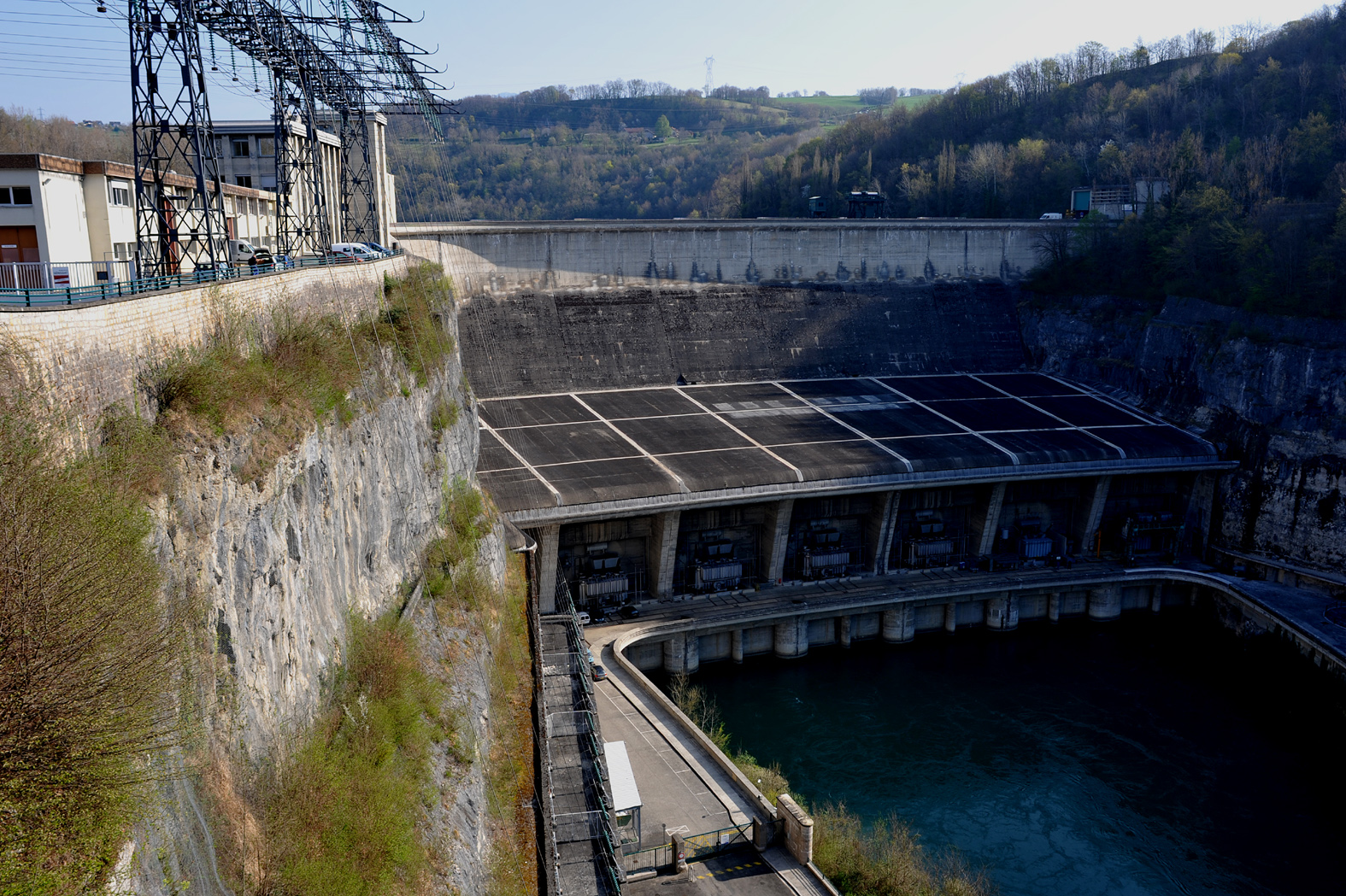
- Génissiat Dam

- Location within France
- Official name: Barrage de Génissiat
- Country: France
- Coordinates: 46.052811°N 5.81225°E
- Construction began: 1937
- Opening date: January 1948

Dam and spillways
- Height: 104.00 m (341.21 ft)
- Length: 165.00 m (541.34 ft)
- Width (crest): 9.00 m
- Width (base): 57.00 m (187.01 ft)
- Dam volume: 440,000 m3

Reservoir
- Total capacity: 56.00 hm3

Power Station
- Installed capacity: 420 MW
- Annual generation: 1,700,000,000 kWh

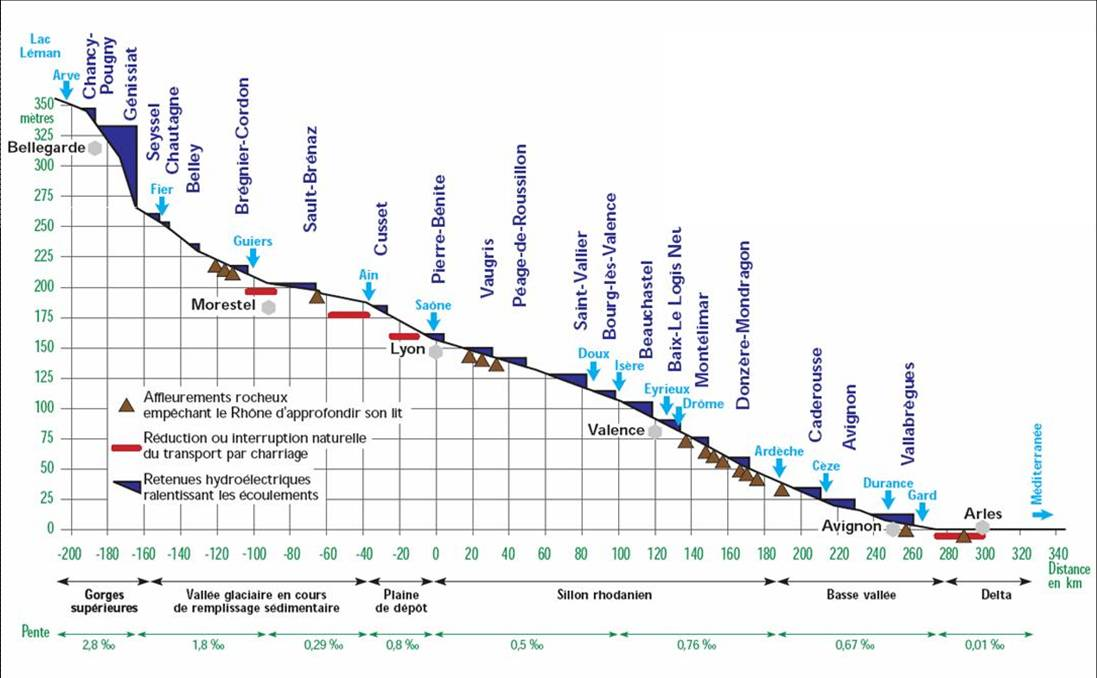
Structure of dams on the Rhône. Génissiat dam is the largest, to the left

The Génissiat Dam (French: Barrage de Génissiat) is a hydroelectric dam on the Rhône in France near the village of Injoux-Génissiat. Construction began in 1937, but was delayed by World War II, and the dam did not start generating power until 1948. By 1949 it had the greatest capacity of any dam in Europe.

== Background ==
The concept of damming the Rhone had been discussed since the 19th century. In 1906 the Harlé-Blondel-Mähl group published a proposal for a great dam at Génissiat. They were supported by the Groupe Giros-Loucheur and by Schneider. They had to compete with a rival proposal by a Franco-Swiss group, and both groups appealed to geologists to support their claims. The French speleologist and expert on limestones Édouard-Alfred Martel declared that the Génissiat scheme was pure folly: It would be impossible to anchor the dam in the limestone, which was anyway porous and would not retain the water. The Swiss Maurice Lugeon, a specialist in large dams, refuted his arguments, declaring that the limestone would hold and calling Martel an amateur experimental geologist. There was no immediate outcome to this debate, but later Lugeon's views were confirmed by tests by the Compagnie Nationale du Rhône.

== Preparatory work ==
The Compagnie Nationale du Rhône (CNR) was founded in 1933 to undertake construction and operation of the dam. In 1934 the state granted the concession to harness the river. The architects were Léon Bazin, Pierre Bourdeix and Albert Laprade. Pierre Danel was the engineer of the spillways and Paul Galabru was the overseeing engineer.

Preliminary work began in February 1937, and official authorization to undertake the project was granted on 21 June 1938. The Léon Chagnaud et fils company was given the contract to divert the Rhone from the site. They built a temporary dam from steel rods and rock to divert the water into two underground channels, both 12 metres (39 ft) wide, 8 metres (26 ft) high and 500 metres (1,600 ft) long. The diversion was opened successfully in April 1939, handling 500 cubic metres (18,000 cu ft) per second of water.

World War II caused delays. On 21 March 1940, the Entreprise de Construction du Barrage de Génissiat (ECBG) was created, a consortium of public works companies. In June 1940, the site was flooded. After the armistice between France and Germany of 22 June 1940, work resumed slowly. Many of the workers joined the underground resistance, and there were several incidents, including a deadly one on 12 February 1944.

== Construction ==
The project restarted in 1945 after the war ended. Three housing estates were built for the workers, with health services and sports and cultural facilities. Most of the concrete was poured between 1946 and 1947, using aggregate delivered by two cable cars from a gravel pit in Pyrimont, 6 kilometres (3.7 mi) downstream. Two spillways were built: an underground channel carrying 1,300 cubic metres (46,000 cu ft) per second and an open channel carrying 2,700 cubic metres (95,000 cu ft) per second, which joins the river over an impressive "ski jump". The dam handles water volumes that vary from over 735 cubic metres (26,000 cu ft) per second down to under 358 cubic metres (12,600 cu ft) per second depending on snow run-off volumes and rainfall.

The hydroelectric station, 143 metres (469 ft) wide by 50 metres (160 ft) high, was designed for six main groups of turbines, each supplied with water by a vertical conduit. The dam was completed in late 1947, and after being impounded was filled on 19–20 January 1948 in under 36 hours. The power plant was connected to Lyon and Paris via high-voltage lines. The first turbine was started in March 1948, and the others between May 1948 and 1957. The crest of the dam supports a road, and can be crossed on foot or by car.

By the end of 1949, Génissiat was the largest hydroelectric power plant in Europe. Between 1954 and 1961 the artery from Génissiat to Paris was upgraded in stages from 225 kV to 380 kV. A monument to the people who died during the dam's construction was consecrated in October 1995. It stands at the entrance to the Génissiat cemetery. The names show that workers came from Italy, Algeria and Poland to help in the construction.

== Gallery ==
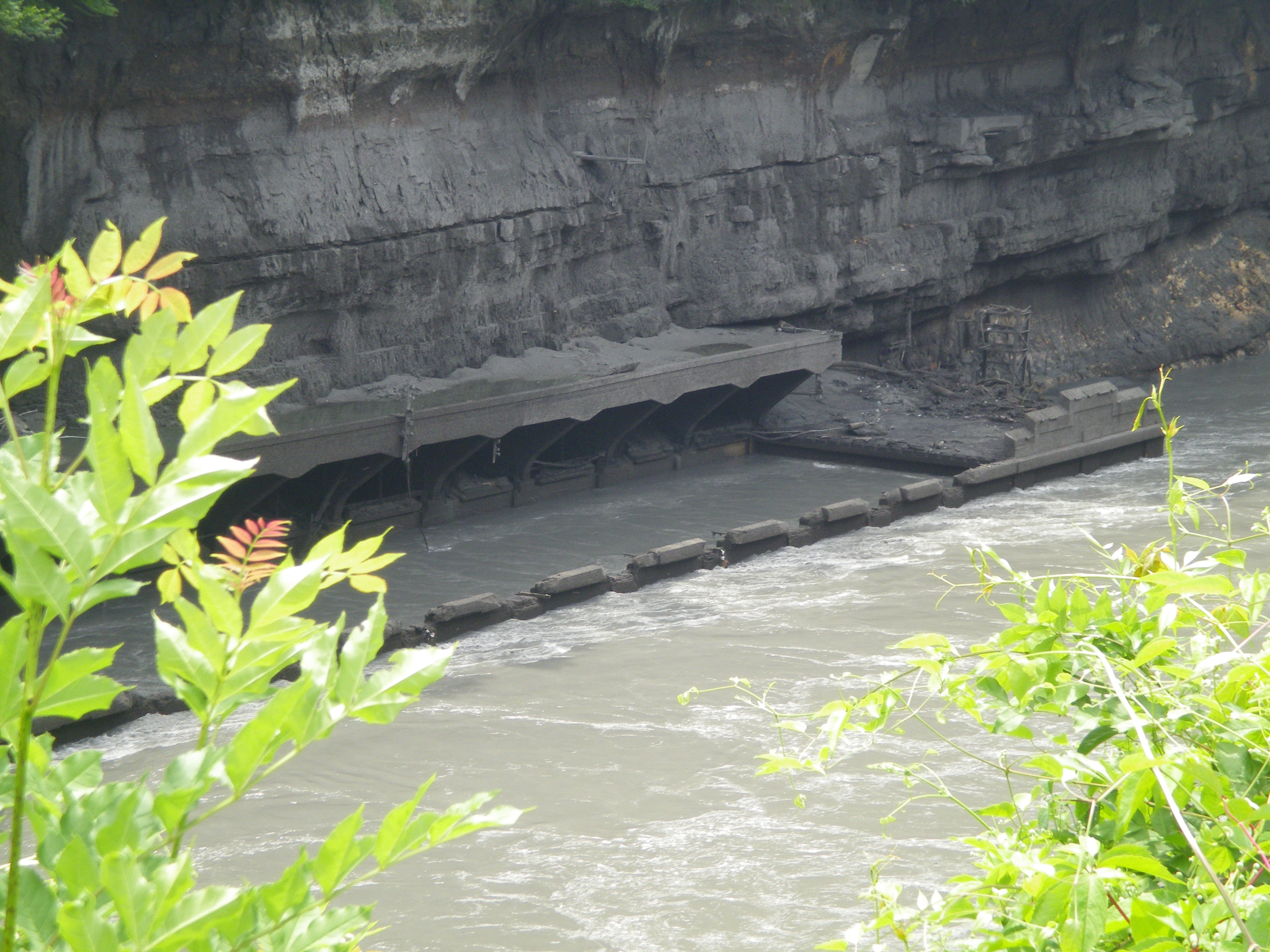
This plant is visible because of a drop in the Rhone. It is normally 15 metres (49 ft) below the level of the river.

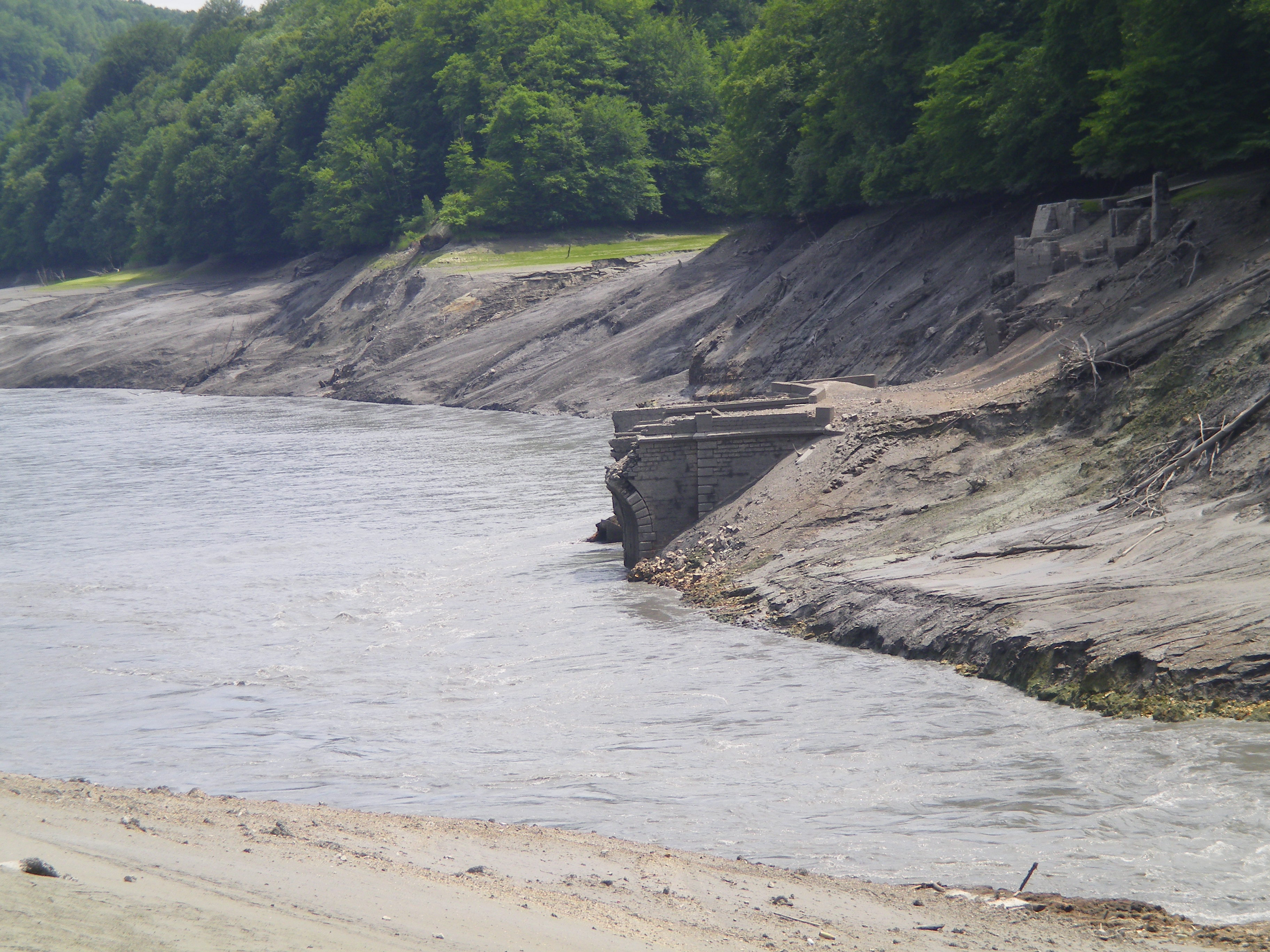
The bridge was demolished by the French military in 1940. Normally it is totally immersed.

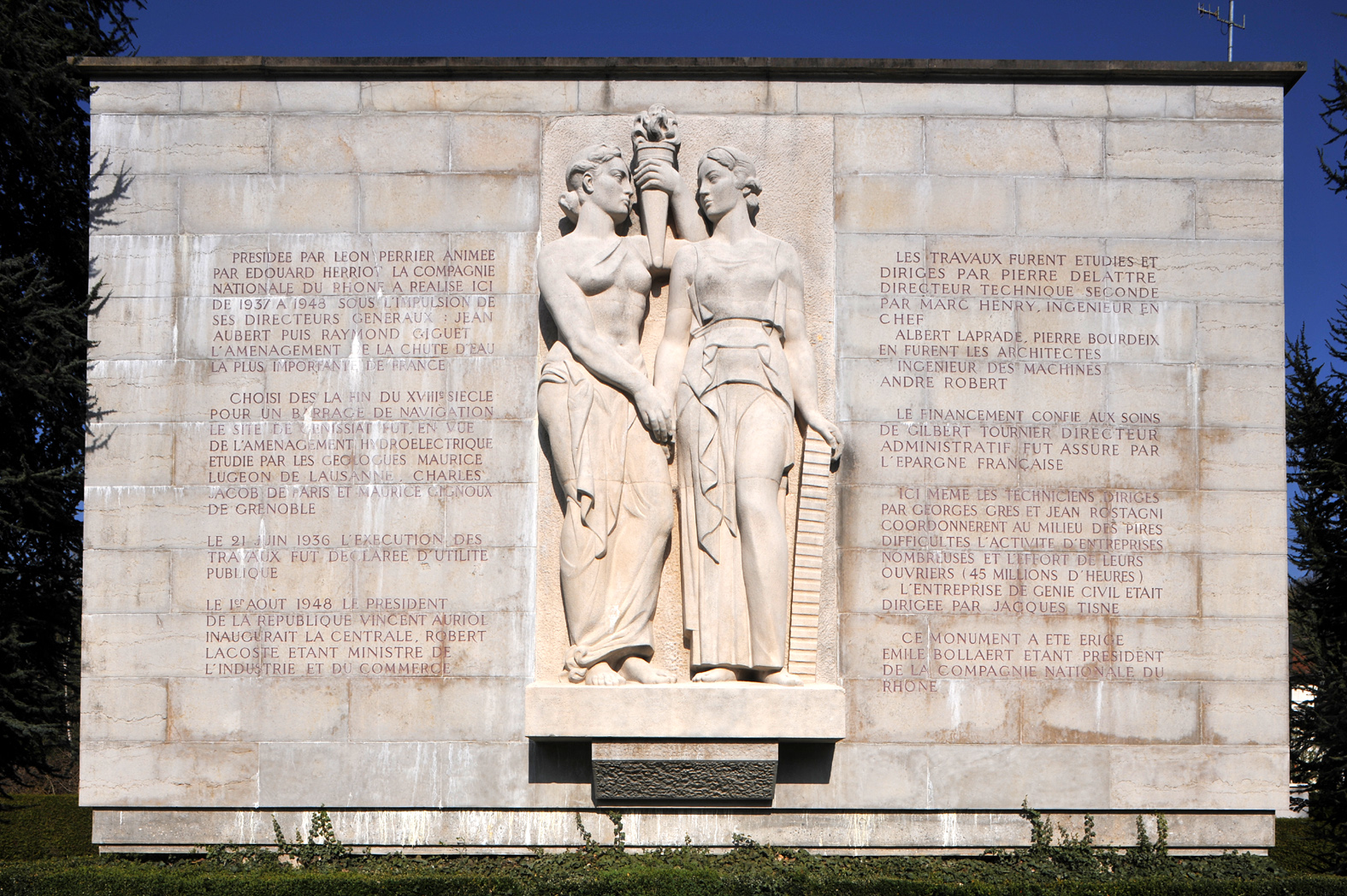
Talsperre Genissiat Monument

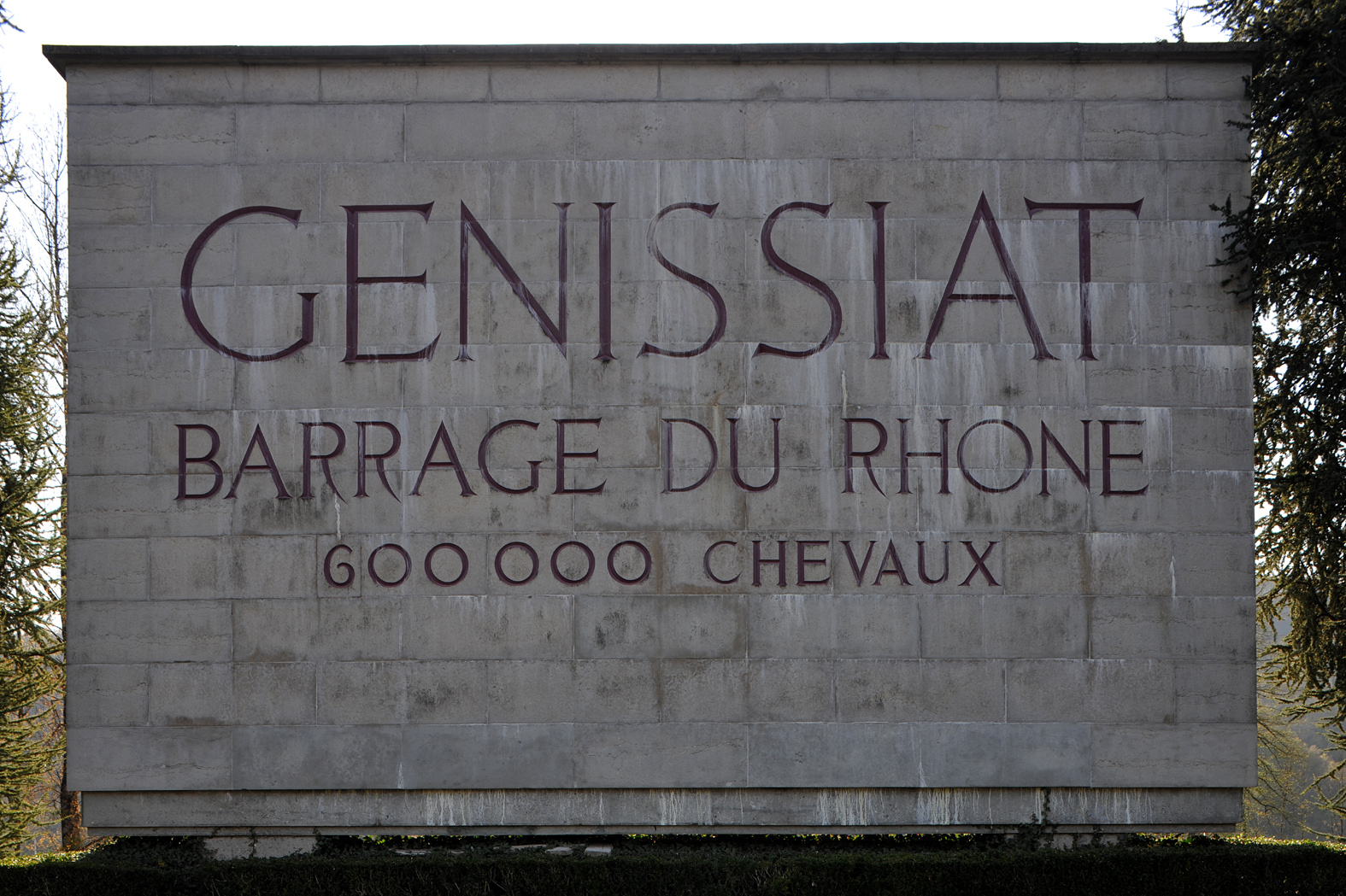
Talsperre Genissiat Monument

== See also ==
- Renewable energy in France
