= Palais de la Porte Dorée =

Museum and aquarium in Paris

Coordinates: 48°50′7″N 2°24′34″E

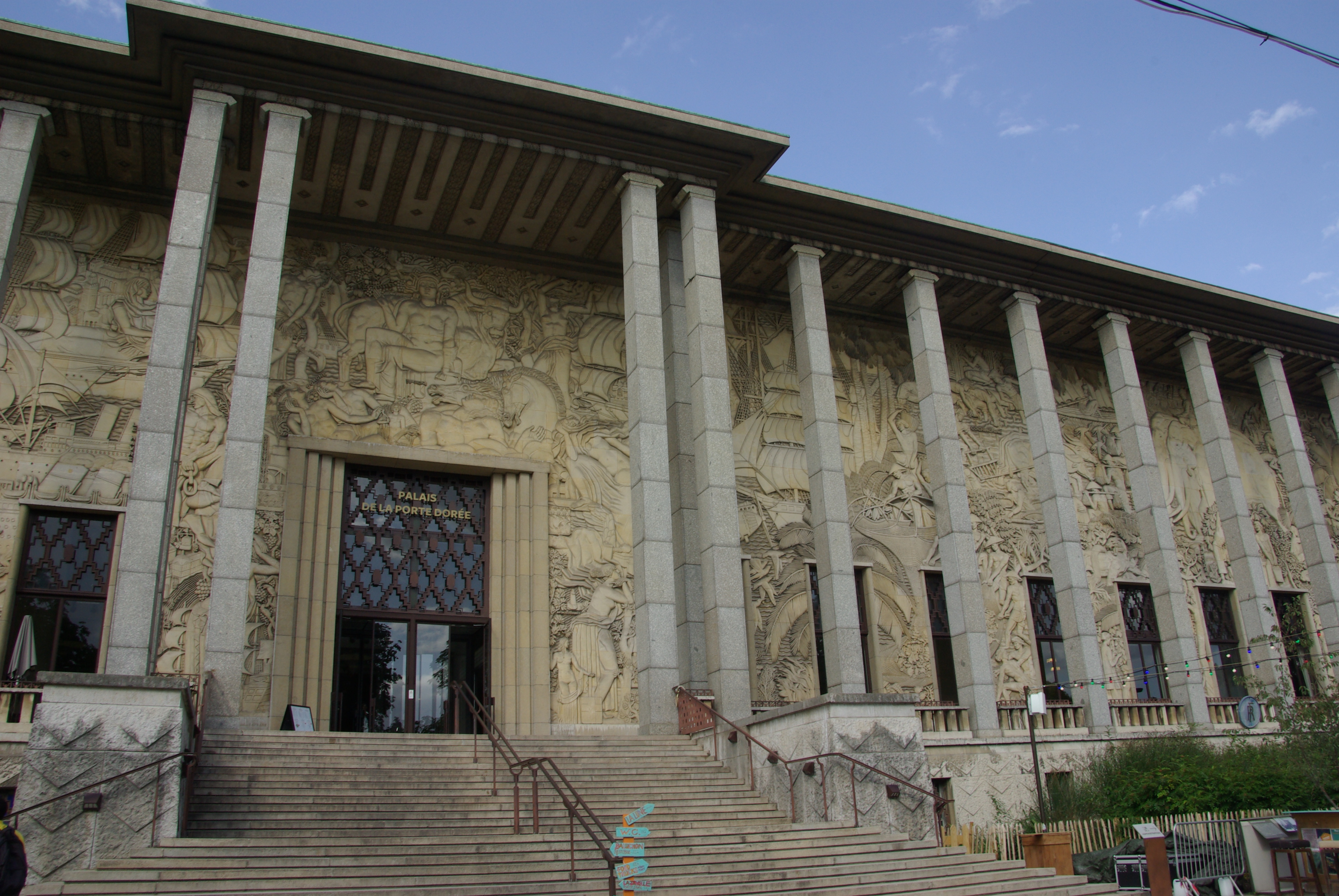
The Palais de la Porte Dorée

The Palais de la Porte Dorée (French pronunciation: [palɛ də la pɔʁt dɔʁe], lit. 'Palace of the Golden Gate') is an exhibit hall located on the edge of the Bois de Vincennes at 293, avenue Daumesnil, 12th arrondissement of Paris, France. It now houses the Musée de l'Histoire de l'Immigration, as well as a tropical aquarium in its cellar.

The building was constructed for the Paris Colonial Exposition of 1931 to designs by French architect Albert Laprade, Léon Jaussely and Léon Bazin. It provides 16,000 m^{2} of exhibition and office space. External bas-reliefs (1200 m^{2}) by sculptor Alfred Janniot portray ships, oceans, and wildlife including antelopes, elephants, zebras, and snakes. The building's bas-reliefs and interior frescoes present an idealized version of colonialism that ignores colonialism's negative impacts. The building is considered a landmark of Art Deco architecture.

The Palais de la Porte Dorée has housed a succession of ethnological museums, starting with the colonial exhibition of 1931, which was renamed in 1935, the Musée de la France d'Outre-mer, then in 1960, the Musée des Arts africains et océaniens, and finally in 1990, the Musée national des Arts d'Afrique et d'Océanie. In 2003, these collections were merged into the Musée du quai Branly, and in its place the building now houses the Cité nationale de l'histoire de l'immigration. In January 2012, the Public Establishment of the Palais de la Porte Dorée (EPPPD) was officially created by decree. It brings together a historical monument, the Palais de la Porte Dorée, a museum, the National Museum of the History of Immigration and a tropical aquarium.

The building's cellar is home to the Dorée Tropical Aquarium (French: Aquarium du palais de la Porte Dorée), which contains about 5,000 animals representing 350 species in a variety of tanks ranging from 100 to 370,000 L (26 to 97,744 US gal) in size.

Views of the Palais de la Porte Dorée
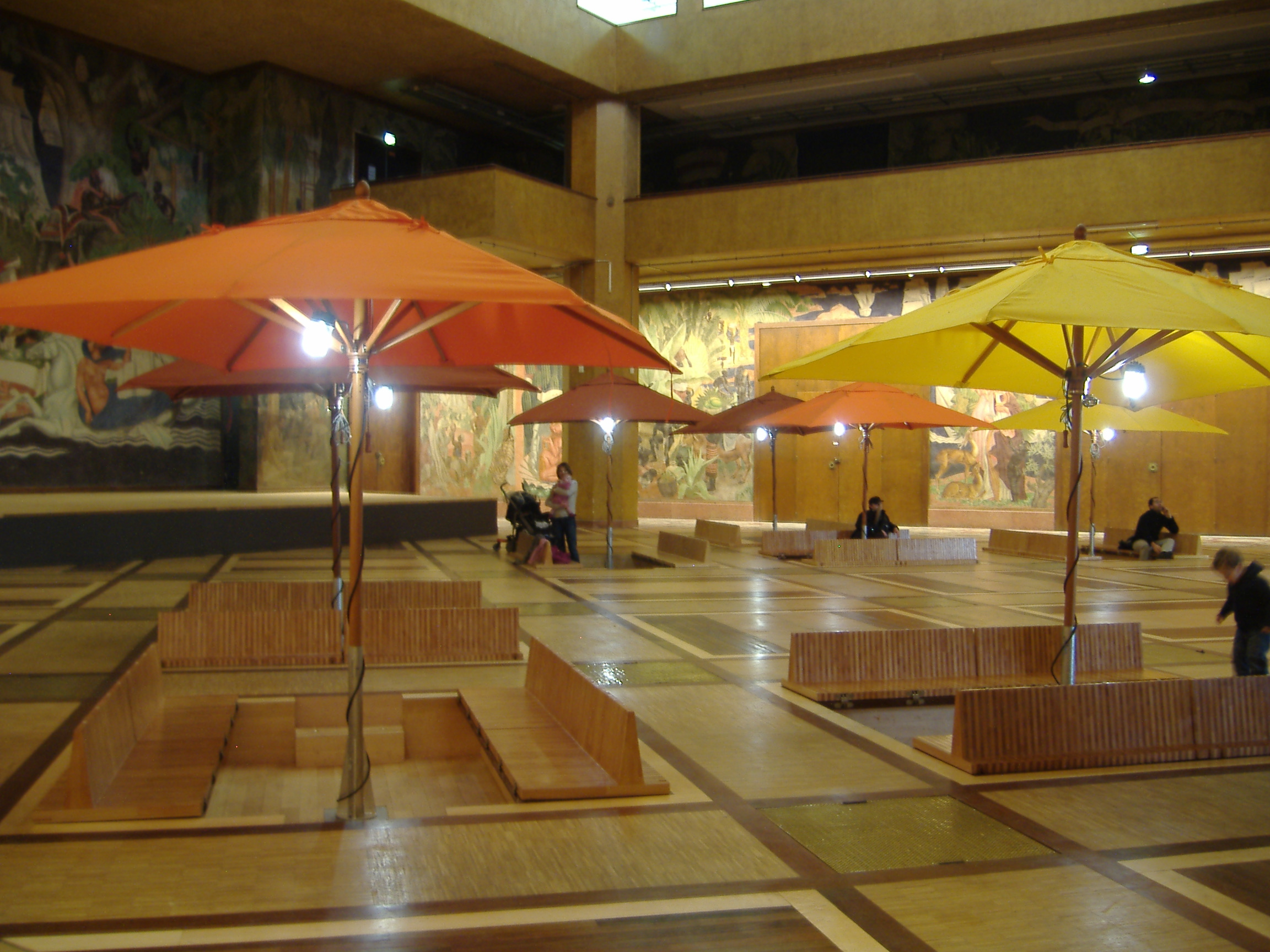
Forum (central court)
Views of the museum and aquarium
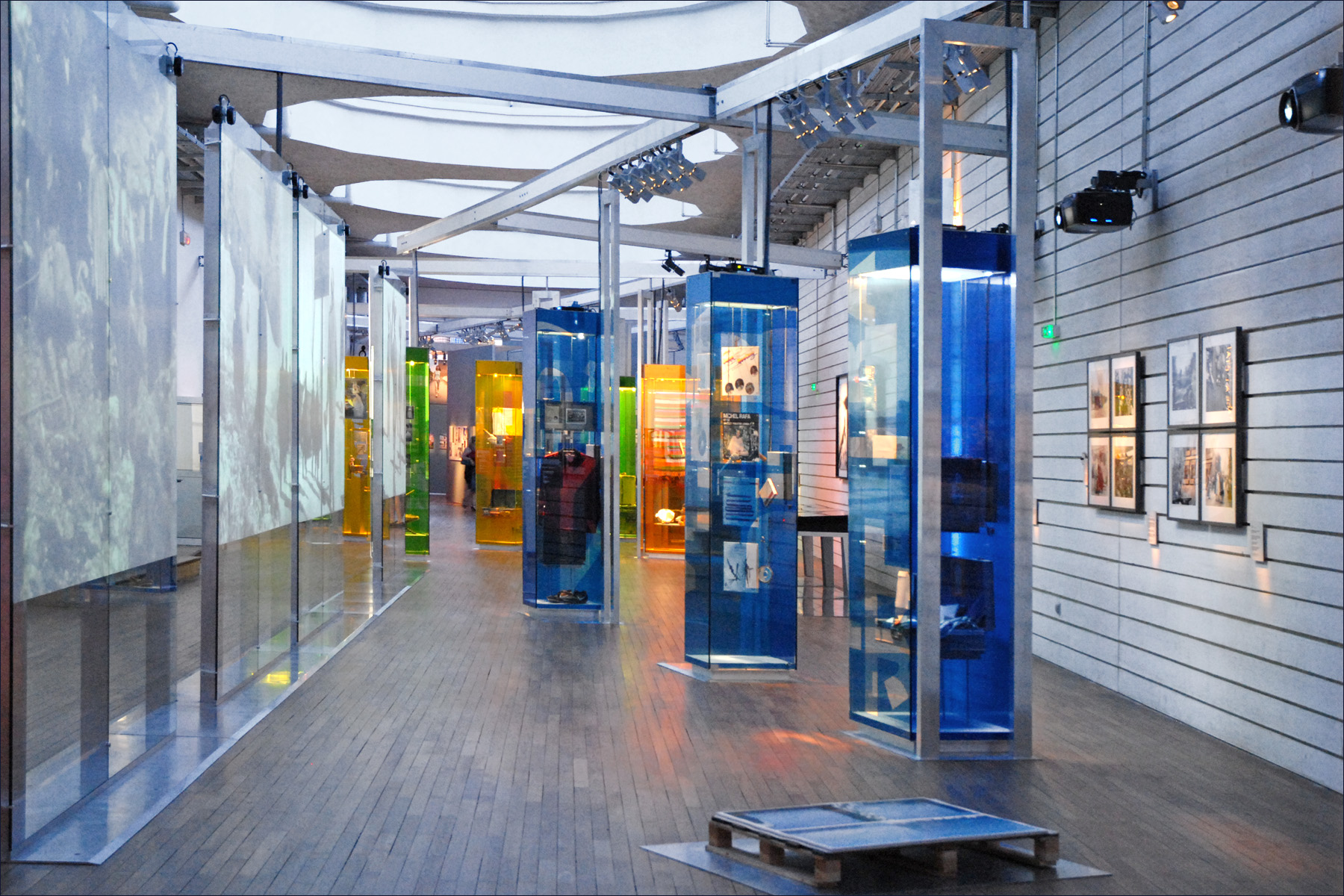
Gallery of the Musée de l'Histoire de l'Immigration

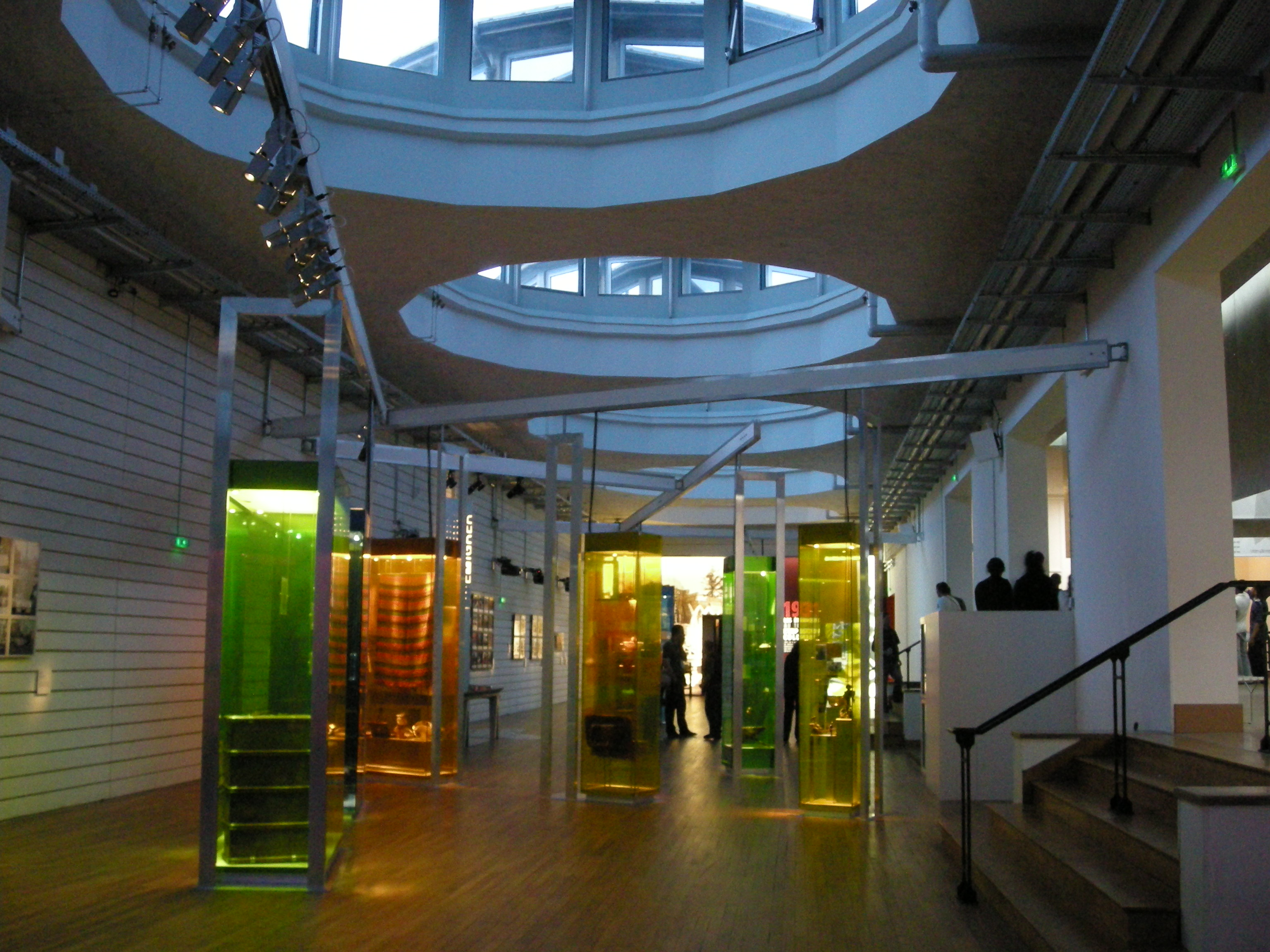
Gallery of the Musée de l'Histoire de l'Immigration

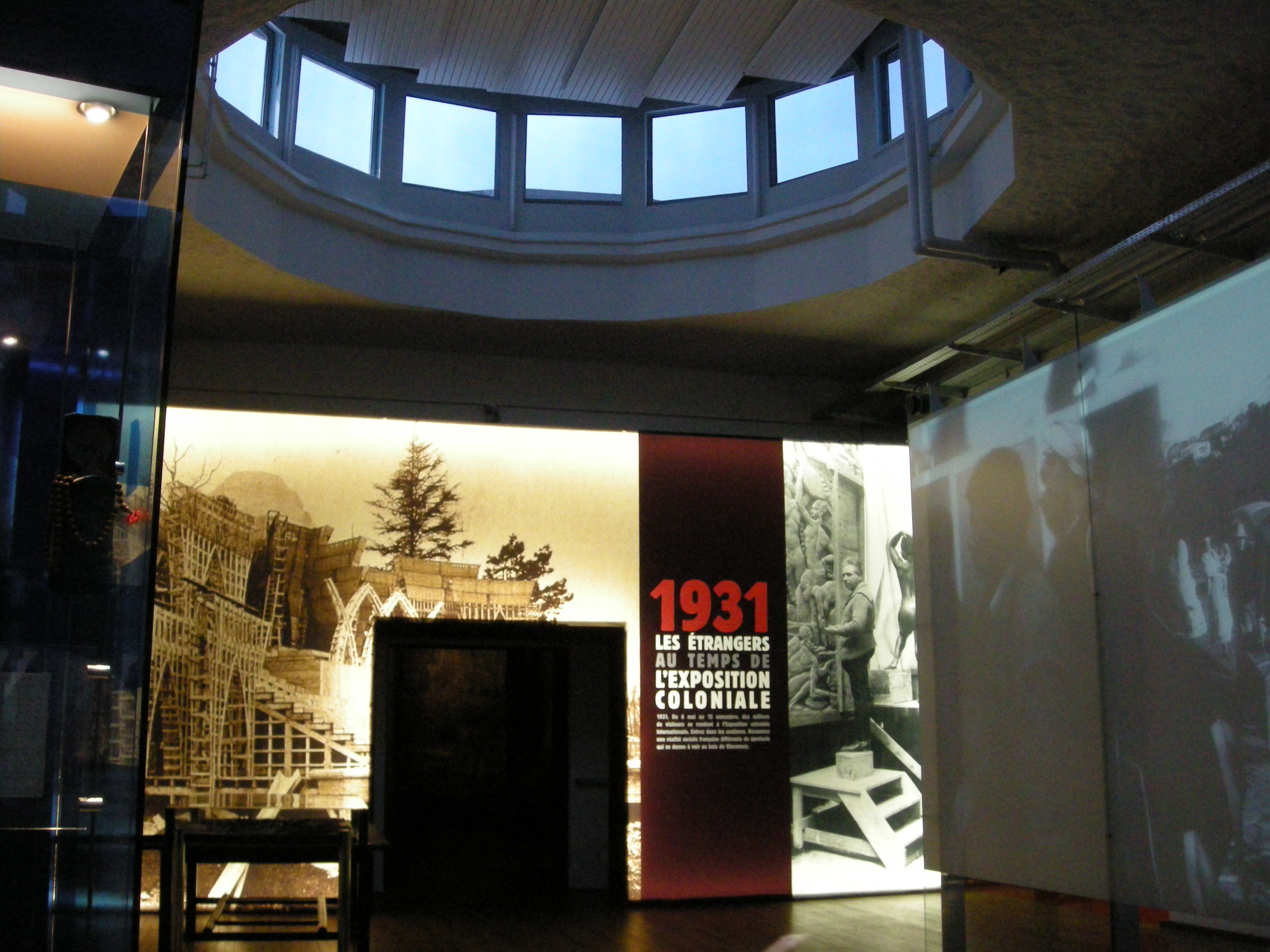
Temporary exhibition

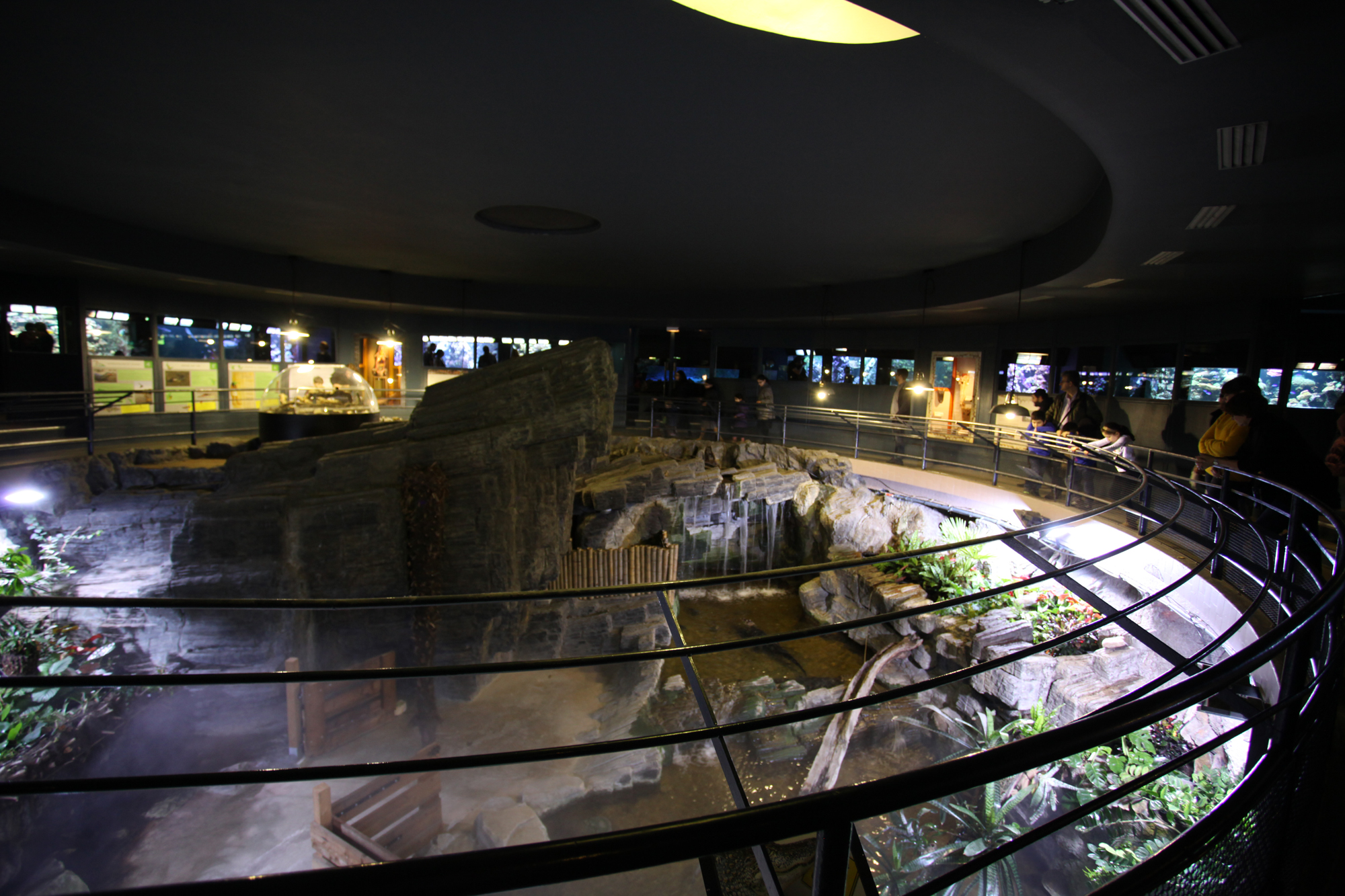
Tropical aquarium

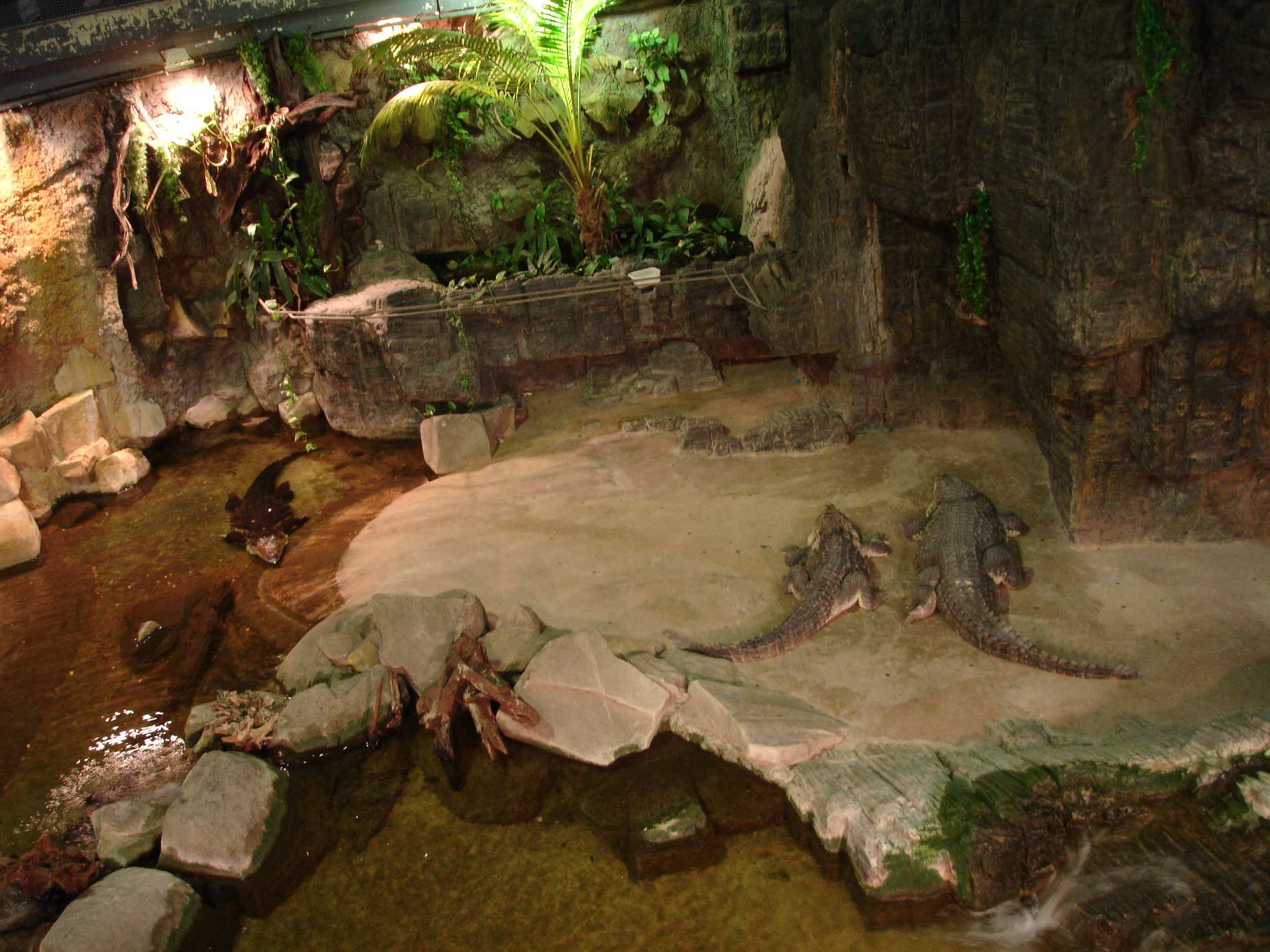
Crocodiles in the tropical aquarium

== See also ==
- List of museums in Paris
