= Reventin-Vaugris =

- Commune
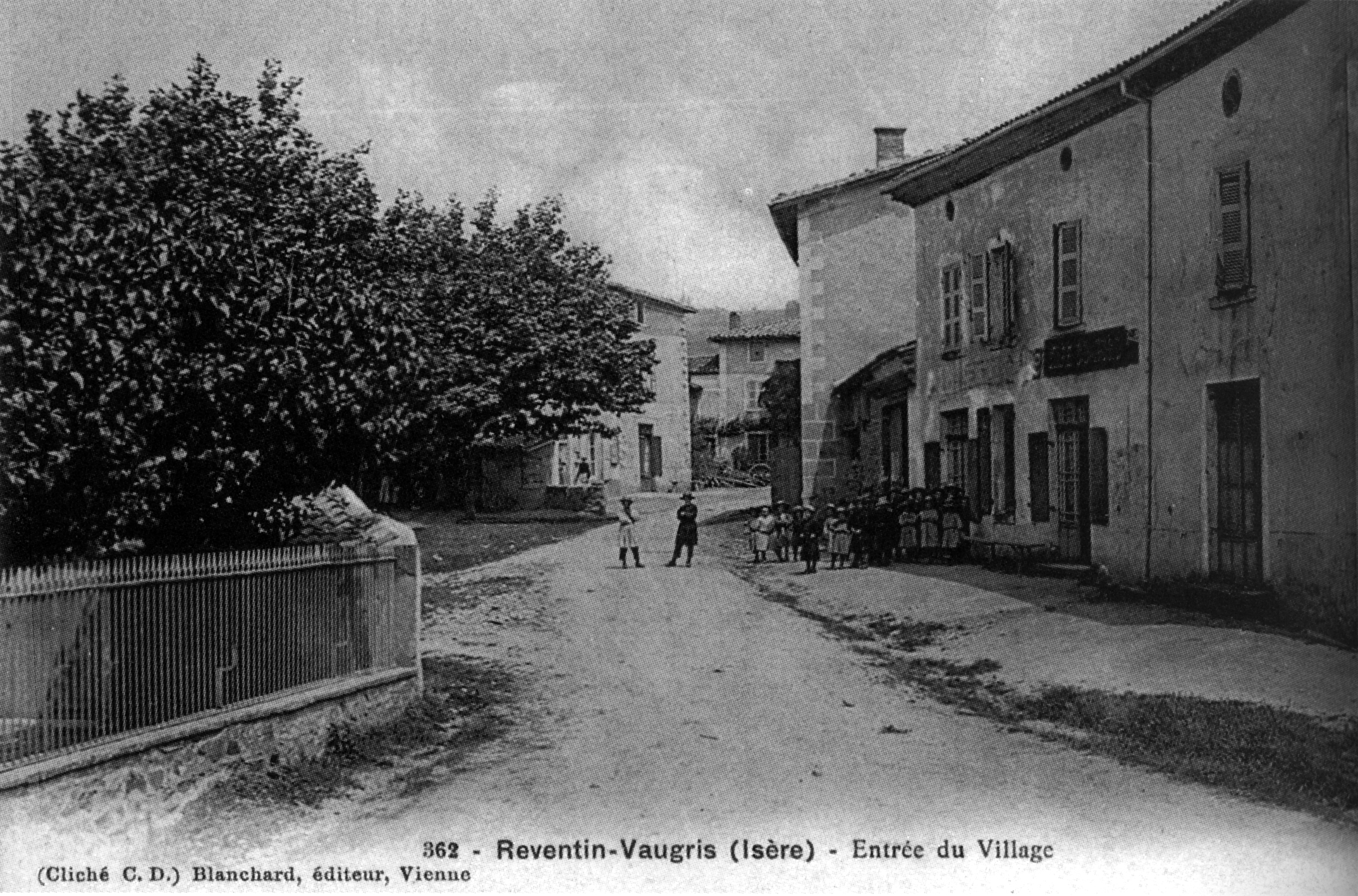
- Reventin-Vaugris in 1906

- Coat of arms
- Location of Reventin-Vaugris
- Location within France Location within Auvergne-Rhône-Alpes
- Coordinates: 45°28′08″N 4°50′29″E
- Country: France
- Region: Auvergne-Rhône-Alpes
- Department: Isère
- Arrondissement: Vienne
- Canton: Vienne-2
- Intercommunality: CA Vienne Condrieu

Government
  - Mayor (2021–2026): Édith Ruchon
- Area^{1}: 18.4 km^{2} (7.1 sq mi)
- Elevation: 280 m (920 ft)
- Highest elevation: 404 m (1,325 ft)
- Lowest elevation: 141 m (463 ft)
- Population (2023): 2,035
  - Density: 111/km^{2} (286/sq mi)
- Time zone: UTC+01:00 (CET)
  - Summer (DST): UTC+02:00 (CEST)
- INSEE/Postal code: 38336 /38121
- ^{1} French Land Register data, which excludes lakes, ponds, glaciers > 1 km^{2} (0.386 sq mi or 247 acres) and river estuaries.

Reventin-Vaugris (French pronunciation: [ʁəvɑ̃tɛ̃ voɡʁi]) is a commune in the Isère department in southeastern France.

Located 6 km (4½ m) south of the Roman town of Vienne, Reventin-Vaugris is well known because of the toll barrier on the A7 motorway that allows thousands of people going southward to the Mediterranean coast.

== Population ==
Historical population

| Year | Pop. | ±% p.a. |
|---|---|---|
| 1793 | 532 | — |
| 1800 | 553 | +0.55% |
| 1806 | 662 | +3.04% |
| 1821 | 757 | +0.90% |
| 1831 | 736 | −0.28% |
| 1836 | 846 | +2.82% |
| 1841 | 874 | +0.65% |
| 1846 | 917 | +0.97% |
| 1851 | 1,405 | +8.91% |
| 1856 | 1,226 | −2.69% |
| 1861 | 1,151 | −1.25% |
| 1866 | 1,184 | +0.57% |
| 1872 | 1,153 | −0.44% |
| 1876 | 1,108 | −0.99% |
| 1881 | 1,008 | −1.87% |
| 1886 | 1,054 | +0.90% |
| 1891 | 954 | −1.97% |
| 1896 | 944 | −0.21% |
| 1901 | 902 | −0.91% |

| Year | Pop. | ±% p.a. |
|---|---|---|
| 1906 | 1,074 | +3.55% |
| 1911 | 884 | −3.82% |
| 1921 | 839 | −0.52% |
| 1926 | 843 | +0.10% |
| 1931 | 804 | −0.94% |
| 1936 | 779 | −0.63% |
| 1946 | 757 | −0.29% |
| 1954 | 810 | +0.85% |
| 1962 | 848 | +0.57% |
| 1968 | 834 | −0.28% |
| 1975 | 913 | +1.30% |
| 1982 | 1,209 | +4.09% |
| 1990 | 1,331 | +1.21% |
| 1999 | 1,577 | +1.90% |
| 2007 | 1,679 | +0.79% |
| 2012 | 1,790 | +1.29% |
| 2017 | 1,909 | +1.30% |
| 2023 | 2,035 | +1.07% |

Source: EHESS and INSEE (1968-2023)

== Twin towns ==
Reventin-Vaugris is twinned with:

- Bodrogkeresztúr, Hungary, since 2006

== See also ==
- Communes of the Isère department
