= Injoux-Génissiat =

Commune in Auvergne-Rhône-Alpes, France

- Commune
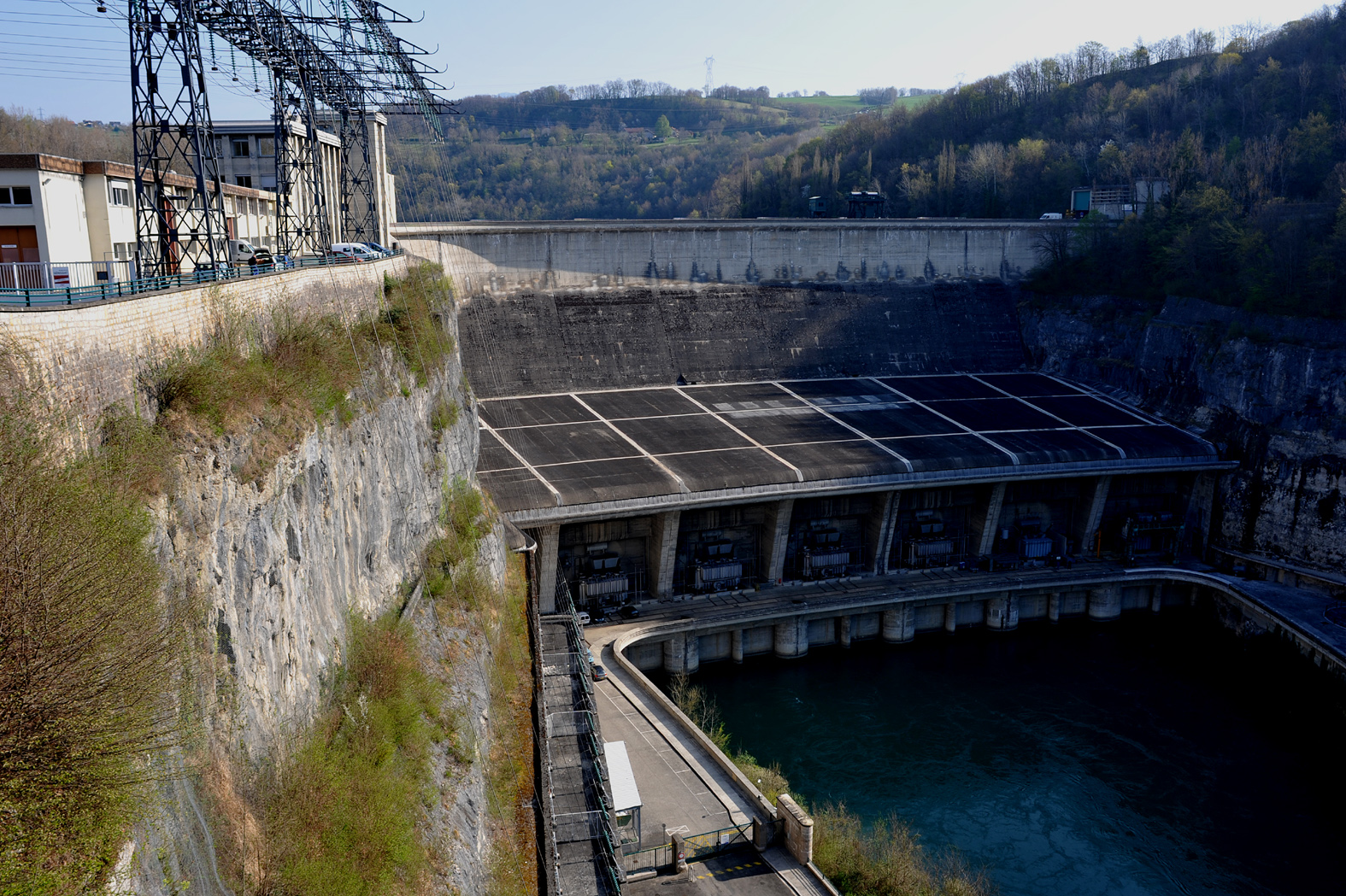
- Génissiat Dam
- Location of Injoux-Génissiat
- Location within France Location within Auvergne-Rhône-Alpes
- Coordinates: 46°03′00″N 5°47′00″E
- Country: France
- Region: Auvergne-Rhône-Alpes
- Department: Ain
- Arrondissement: Nantua
- Canton: Valserhône
- Intercommunality: CC Terre Valserhône

Government
  - Mayor (2026–32): Denis Mossaz
- Area^{1}: 29.61 km^{2} (11.43 sq mi)
- Elevation: 556 m (1,824 ft)
- Highest elevation: 1,342 m (4,403 ft)
- Lowest elevation: 266 m (873 ft)
- Population (2023): 1,115
  - Density: 37.66/km^{2} (97.53/sq mi)
- Time zone: UTC+01:00 (CET)
  - Summer (DST): UTC+02:00 (CEST)
- INSEE/Postal code: 01189 /01200
- Website: Municipal website
- ^{1} French Land Register data, which excludes lakes, ponds, glaciers > 1 km^{2} (0.386 sq mi or 247 acres) and river estuaries.

Injoux-Génissiat (French pronunciation: [ɛ̃ʒu ʒenisja]) is a commune in the Ain department in eastern France. It was created in 1973 by the merger of two former communes: Injoux and Craz-en-Michaille. The village is beside the Génissiat Dam, a major hydro-electric dam on the Rhône.

== Politics and administration ==
List of successive Mayors of Injoux-Génissiat
In office		Mayor	Party	Capacity	Ref.
1973	March 1983	René Neyret	PCF		
March 1983	21 June 2004	Crescenzo Roland Méola	PCF	Died in office.	
July 2004	June 2010	Jean-Luc Demarquet			
June 2010	July 2020	Albert Cochet			
July 2020	Incumbent	Denis Mossaz	DVG		

== Population ==
Historical population
Year	Pop.	±% p.a.
1968	893	—
1975	851	−0.69%
1982	750	−1.79%
1990	940	+2.86%
1999	970	+0.35%
2007	975	+0.06%
2012	1,117	+2.76%
2017	1,136	+0.34%
2023	1,115	−0.31%
Source: INSEE

== See also ==
- Communes of the Ain department
