= Cheney (surname) =

Cheney, originally de Cheney, is a toponymic surname of Old French origin, introduced into England by the Normans.

The derivation is from the Old French chesne (modern French: chêne) "oak tree" with the Old French suffix -ei / -ai meaning "collection of [trees]", so chenei "oak grove", from Medieval Latin casnetum. The surname may be either locational or topographical in origin. As a locational name, Cheney may derive from any of the places named with the Old French chesnei, nowadays Chesney, Chesnay, le Chesnay, la Chesnaye, etc. As a topographical name, Cheney denoted residence near a conspicuous oak tree, or in an oak forest. The surname is now found widespread in Scotland, where the first known bearer of the name is William de Chesne, who witnessed a charter in 1200. The development of the name includes the following examples and may refer to:

- Alfred Cheney Johnston (1885–1971), American photographer known for his portraits of Ziegfeld Follies showgirls
- Amherst B. Cheney (1841–1927), American politician from Michigan
- Amy Marcy Cheney Beach (1867–1944), first American female composer of large-scale art music
- Arthur Cheney Train (1875–1945), American lawyer and writer of legal thrillers
- Ben Cheney (1905–1971), lumber businessman
- Benjamin Pierce Cheney (1815–1895), American businessman
- Brainard Cheney (1900–1990), American novelist, playwright and essayist
- C. R. Cheney (1906–1987), medieval historian
- Charles E. Cheney (1836–1916), Reformed Episcopal Church bishop from New York
- Chris Cheney (born 1975), guitarist and lead singer of Australian rock band The Living End
- Colin Cheney (born 1978), American poet
- David D. Cheney (1822–1904), Wisconsin State Assembly member
- David W. Cheney (1859–1913), Wisconsin State Assembly member
- Dick Cheney (1941–2025), Vice President of the United States from 2001 to 2009
- Dorothy Cheney (1916–2014), tennis player
- Dorothy Cheney (scientist) (1950–2018), American scientist who studied the wild primates in their natural habitat
- Edith C. Cheney (1888–1953), New York assemblywoman 1940–1944
- Ednah Dow Littlehale Cheney (1824–1904), Boston writer, reformer and philanthropist
- Captain Edward Cheney (1788–1846) led the Royal Scots Greys as temporary Brevet Colonel at the Battle of Waterloo.
- Edwin Cheney (1869–1942), commissioned the Frank Lloyd Wright Cheney House
- Elizabeth Cheney (1422–1473), English aristocrat
- Ellen Cheney Johnson (1829–1899), American prison reformer
- Elliott Ward Cheney Jr. (1929–2016), University of Texas mathematician and professor
- Emily Cheney Neville (1919–1997), author and Newbury Medal winner
- Eric Cheney (1924–2001), English motorcycle racer, designer and independent constructor
- Flora Cheney (1872–1929), Illinois state representative
- George Edward Cheney, American educator and internationally recognized leader in the area of organizational communication
- Grahame Cheney (born 1969), Australian boxer
- Guy W. Cheney (1886–1939), New York politician
- Hampton J. Cheney (1836–1927), American politician
- Harry Morrison Cheney (1860–1937), Speaker of the New Hampshire House of Representatives
- Harriet Vaughan Cheney (1796–1889), American-Canadian novelist
- Herbert Cheney (1873–1931), American college football coach and educator
- Horace B. Cheney (1868–1938), American administrator
- Howard Lovewell Cheney (1889–1969), American architect and engineer, who designed Washington National Airport
- Howell Cheney (1870–1957), American silk manufacturer
- Ian Cheney, American film producer
- Janice Wright Cheney, Canadian textile artist
- John Cheney (disambiguation), several people
- Kimberly B. Cheney (born 1935), Vermont attorney general
- Kyle Cheney (footballer) (born 1989), Australian rules football player
- Kyle Cheney (journalist), journalist for Politico
- Larry Cheney (1886–1969), American baseball player
- Lauren Cheney (born 1987), American soccer player
- Liana Cheney (born 1942), Italian art historian
- Liz Cheney (born 1966), United States Representative, daughter of Vice President Dick Cheney
- Louis R. Cheney (1859–1944), American businessman and politician from Connecticut
- Lynne Cheney (born 1941), wife of United States Vice President Dick Cheney
- Margaret Cheney (disambiguation), multiple people
- Marjory Cheney (1880–1967), American politician
- Martha Cheney (born 1953), American author
- Mary Cheney (born 1969), daughter of United States Vice President Dick Cheney
- Mary Moulton Cheney (1871–1957), artist and visual arts educator in Minneapolis
- Mary Young Cheney Greeley (1811/1814–1872), wife of Horace Greeley
- May L. Cheney (1862–1942), California educator and Appointment Secretary at University of California, Berkeley
- Moses Cheney (1793–1875), abolitionist, printer and legislator from New Hampshire
- Nelson W. Cheney (1875–1944), New York politician
- Oren Burbank Cheney (1816–1903), abolitionist, founder of Bates College and Maine state representative
- Person Colby Cheney (1828–1901), United States Senator, Governor of New Hampshire
- Peter Cheney, Canadian newspaper writer
- Ray Cheney, rugby union player and sportsman from Wales
- Richard Cheyney (1513–1579), bishop of Gloucester from 1562, opponent of the Calvinism
- Richard Cheney (New Mexico politician), state representative (2003–2007)
- Rufus Cheney Jr., Wisconsin State Assembly member
- Russell Cheney (1881–1945), American painter
- Ruth Cheney Streeter (1895–1990), the first director of the United States Marine Corps Women's Reserve (USMCWR)
- Seth Wells Cheney (1810–1856), American artist and pioneer of crayon work
- Sheldon Warren Cheney (1886–1980), American author and critic
- Sherwood Cheney (1873–1949), U.S. Army Corps of Engineers brigadier general
- Stephen A. Cheney, U.S. Marine Corps brigadier general
- Syl Cheney-Coker (born 1945), poet, novelist and journalist from Sierra Leone
- Thomas Cheney (c. 1485 – 1558), Lord Warden of the Cinque Ports
- Thomas C. Cheney (1868–1957), Vermont politician
- Tom Cheney (disambiguation), several people
- Valerie Key-Cheney, Apache politician
- Ward Cheney (1813–1876), American pioneer manufacturer of silk fabrics
- William de Chesney (sheriff), oldest-known member of the Cheney family, 12th-century sheriff of Norfolk
- Yarrow Cheney, American production designer, visual effects artist, director and animator

== See also ==
- Chaney, surname
- Cheaney, surname
- Chesney, surname and given name
- Cheyne, surname and given name
- Duquesne (disambiguation)
- Lila Cheney, a Marvel Comics character
