= Chaney (disambiguation) =

Chaney is a surname.

Chaney may also refer to:

== People ==
- Chaney family, Australian political family
- Lon Chaney, U.S. acting family

== People with the given name ==
- Chaney Kley (1972-2007), U.S. actor
- Chaney White (1894-1967), baseball player

== Other ==
- Chaney Glacier, in Montana, U.S.A.
- Chaney High School, Youngstown, Ohio, U.S.A.
- Hall–Chaney House, NRHP in Milwaukie, Oregon, U.S.A.

== See also ==
- Heckler v. Chaney, a U.S. Supreme Court case
- John Chaney (disambiguation)
- Chany, Russia
- Chanie, Poland
- Cheyne, a surname and given name
- Cheney (disambiguation)
