= Arnage =

Arnage may refer to:

- Arnage, Aberdeenshire a village in Scotland
  - Arnage Castle, a country house incorporating a 16th-century tower
  - Arnage Primary School, a rural school
  - Arnage railway station, a station on the Formartine and Buchan Railway
- Bentley Arnage, a model of luxury car
- Arnage, Sarthe, a commune of the Sarthe département in France
- The Arnage corner of the Circuit de la Sarthe, a racetrack in France (likely named after the above community)
