= Cheney =

Cheney often refers to:

- Cheney (surname), people with the name

Cheney may also refer to:

== Places ==
=== Canada ===
- Cheney, Ontario, a community in the city of Clarence-Rockland

=== United States ===
- Cheney, Kansas
- Cheney, Missouri
- Cheney, Nebraska
- Cheney, Washington

=== United Kingdom ===
- Cheney Longville, Shropshire, England
- Sutton Cheney, Leicestershire, England

== Buildings ==
- Cheney School, Oxford, United Kingdom
- Cheney Stadium, Tacoma, Washington

== See also ==
- Cheyney (disambiguation)
- Chaney (disambiguation)
- Chanay, a commune in the French département of Ain
- Cheny, a commune of the Yonne département in France
- Cheneyville (disambiguation)
