= Chaney =

Chaney is a surname. Notable people with the surname include:

- Beej Chaney (1957–2025), American punk/new wave musician
- Cassius Chaney (born 1987), American boxer
- Charles "Bubba" Chaney (born 1946), American politician
- Chris Chaney, American musician
- Darrel Chaney, American baseball player
- Don Chaney, American basketball player and coach
- Edward Chaney, Cultural historian
- Esty Chaney (1891–1952), American baseball player
- Fred Chaney, Australian Liberal Party politician and minister in the Fraser government (son of Fred snr)
- Fred Chaney Sr., Australian Liberal Party politician and minister in the Menzies government
- George Chaney (1892–1958), American boxer
- Gregory Chaney, American politician
- Harold O. Chaney, founder of Chaney's department stores in Greater Los Angeles
- James Chaney (1943–1964), American civil rights activist
- James E. Chaney (1885–1967), American military officer
- James M. Chaney (1921–1976), American police officer and witness to President Kennedy's assassination
- James McDonald Chaney, American Presbyterian minister
- John Chaney (disambiguation) (several entries)
- Kate Chaney, Australian independent politician
- Lindsay Chaney, American news editor
- Lon Chaney (1883–1930), American actor
- Lon Chaney Jr. (1906–1973), American actor
- Michael Chaney, Australian businessman
- Mike Chaney (born 1944), Insurance Commissioner of Mississippi
- Norman Chaney (1918–1936), American child actor
- Olivia Chaney (born 1982), English folk singer
- Ralph Works Chaney (1890–1971) American paleobotanist.
- Tray Chaney, American actor
- William Chaney (1922–2013), American educator

== Fictional characters ==
- Markoff Chaney, a character from The Illuminatus! Trilogy
- Tom Chaney, a character from "True Grit"

== See also ==
- Chanay
- Cheney
- Chesney
