= Cieply =

Cieply or Ciepły ("warm" in Polish) is a surname. Notable people include:

- Michael Cieply (born 1951), American journalist
- Olgierd Ciepły (1936–2007), Polish hammer thrower
- Teresa Ciepły (1937–2006), Polish sprinter and hurdler
