= Kuba drinking horn =

African drinking horn

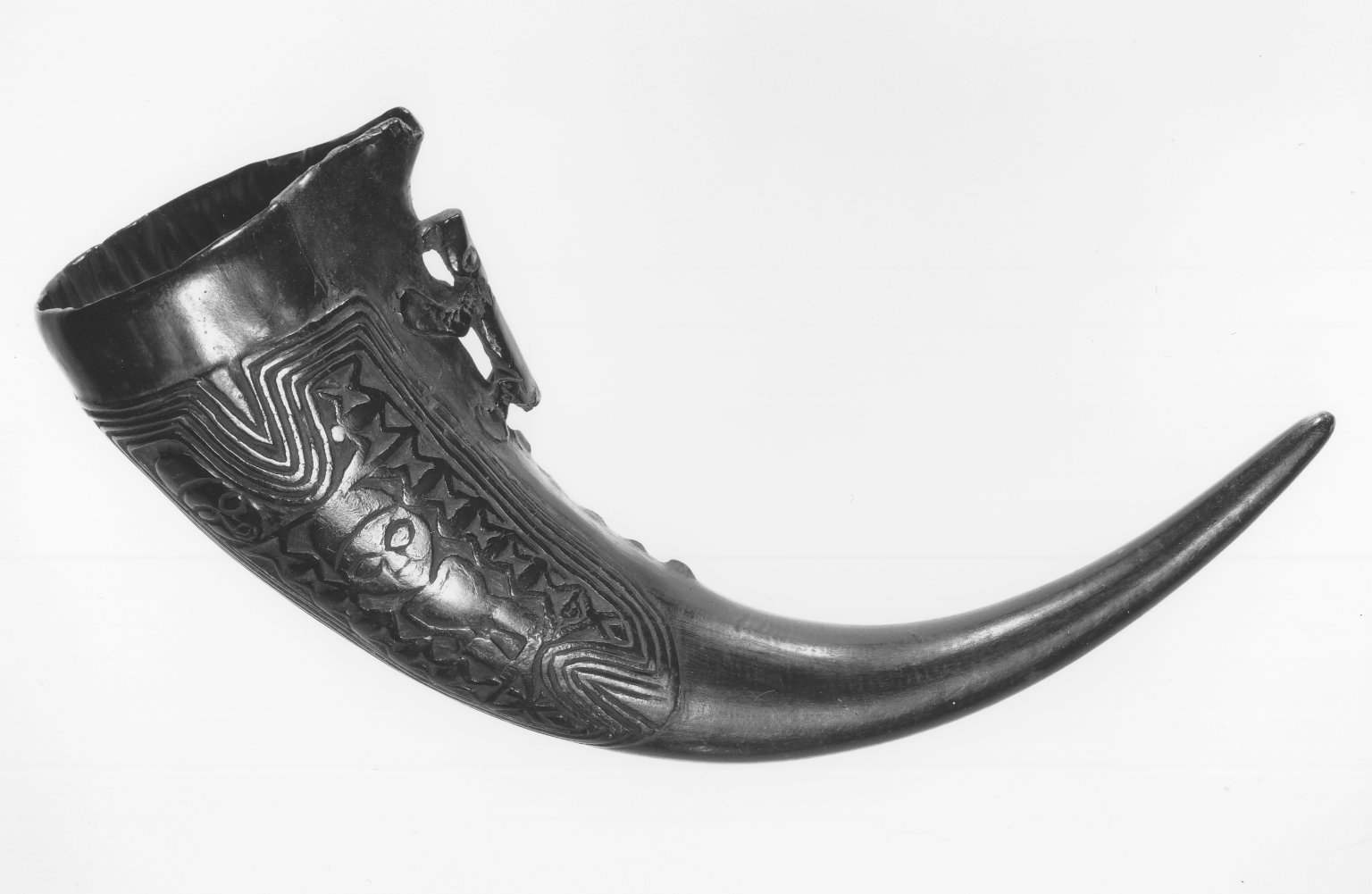
Similar drinking horn found at the Brooklyn Museum

On display in the Art Institute of Chicago, in the African Art and Indian Art of the Americas, is a 19th-century drinking horn. Originally from the Kuba Kingdom, the drinking horn is made out of wood, iron, and copper alloy. Drinking horns were usually a gift to the friends and family of kings or given to a warrior.

== History ==
=== Kuba Kingdom ===
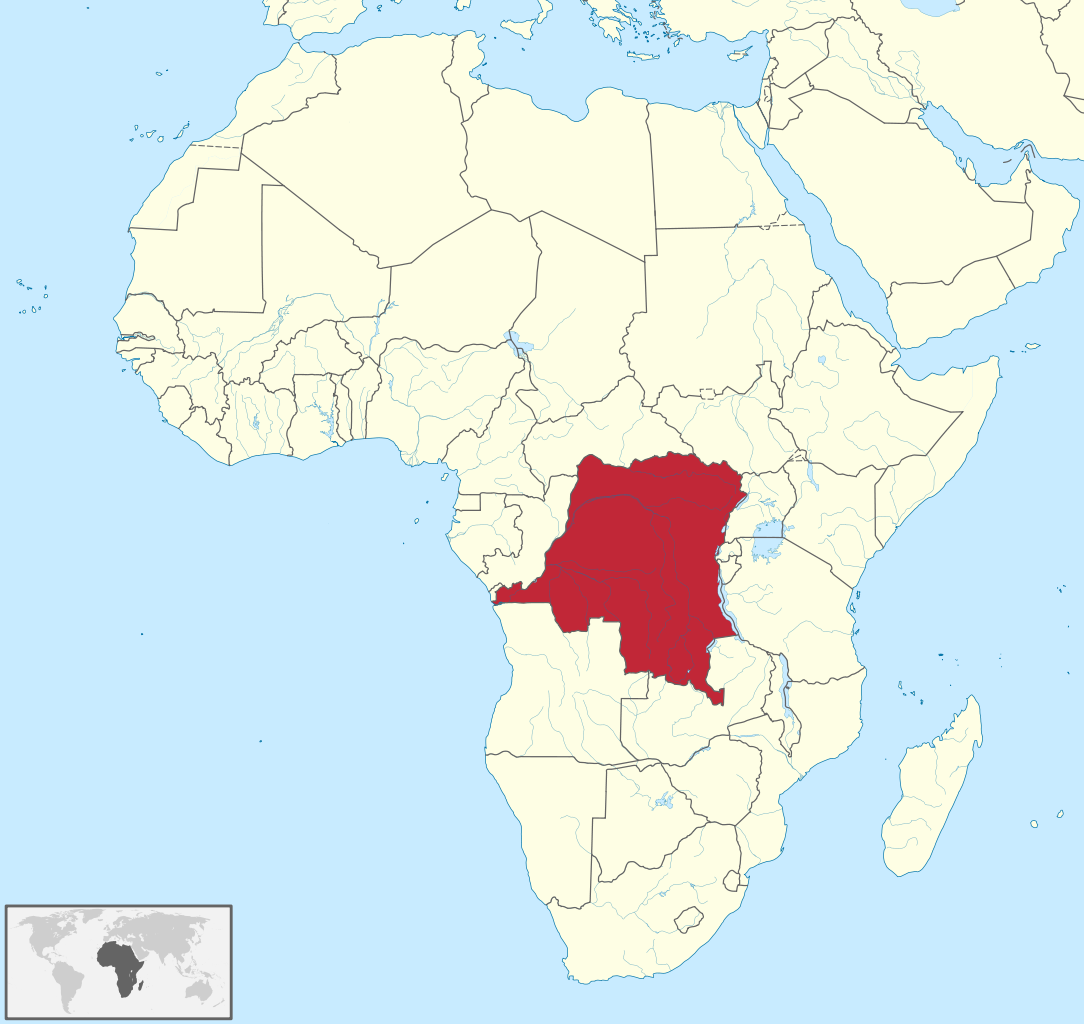
Highlights where Congo is

The Kuba Kingdom, founded in the 17th century, is located in the Democratic Republic of Congo. It held nine provinces and chiefdoms were a part of that society. They were surrounded by other tribes such as the Yaka, Suku, Pende, etc. The people from the Kuba kingdom were also known as the Bakuba. They were skilled at hunting, farming, and fishing. One of the more important aspects of the Kuba kingdom was their religion. They were heavily based on the spirits of mother earth and those of their past kings. When it came to their religious ceremonies, the way someone was buried depended on the items placed in the coffin. For the wealthy, they had several items such as delicate figurines, masks, and drinking cups placed in their coffin. The detail and quality of the items told where they were in the social hierarchy.

== 19th Century Drinking Horn ==
=== Object History ===
The Kuba kingdom was located in what is known today as the Democratic Republic of Congo. The kingdom was known for their supernatural powers and spiritual beliefs. Like many kingdoms, royalty was one of the most important parts. Besides having one ruler, they had 19 other rulers underneath the king that managed the 19 groups in Kuba. One of the many ways that these kings showed their status and power was by the amount of money they spent. When it comes to drinking horns, kings would give them out to their family and friends to show their wealth and generosity. Drinking horns were one of the many objects that showed class. The more elegant and intrinsic the design, the higher in society they were. The patterns and material made for the drinking horn was an important aspect to show status. Drinking horns were typically used to drink palm wine. The intake of this beverage is an example of something that was done with events held by the king. This may also be an event in which the king shows his generosity and hands out gifts. The drinking horn is in the shape of a buffalo horn that symbolizes the status of the warrior that received it. The design of the horn includes patterns that are in a geometrical shape, a crocodile, and a hand. This specific drinking horn has an attachment made out of iron that can be attached to a belt that the warrior would wear. The fact that the drinking horn has this accessory and option to be attached to a belt shows a high level of status within not only the Kuba society, but also the warrior community.

=== Ownership History ===
This specific drinking horn was first owned by object collector, Raoul Blondiau. He was a collector and diplomat who was based in Brussels. Blondiau is a well-known collector that is mentioned several times in many different institutions. Blondiau then sold the drinking horn to the Theatre Arts Monthly in New York City. It was a part of the Harlem Museum of African Art Travelling Exhibit at that time. During the ownership of the Theater Arts Monthly, it was lent to the Chicago Children’s Museum for Negro in Art Week. It was lent during the month of December. Being a part of a traveling exhibit, the object moved around. At one point, it was lent to the Memorial Art Gallery in Rochester, New York. In the Art Institute of Chicago’s website, it is said to have been gifted to the museum by G. F. Harding in 1928. No information has been found concerning G. F. Harding.
