= Thomas Cheyne =

Thomas Cheyne may refer to:

- Thomas Cheyne (MP for Rye), English MP
- Thomas Kelly Cheyne, English divine and biblical critic
- Thomas Cheyne (MP for Kent)

== See also ==
- Thomas Cheney (disambiguation)
