= Cheaney =

Cheaney is a surname. Notable people with the name include:

- Calbert Cheaney (born 1971), American basketball player and coach
- Joe Bailey Cheaney (1902–1983), American football and basketball coach

== See also ==
- Chaney, surname
- Cheney (surname)
