= Plagne =

Plagne may refer to:

- Plagne, Ain, a French commune in the Ain department
- Plagne, Haute-Garonne, a French commune in the Haute-Garonne department
- La Plagne, a French ski resort
- Plagne, Switzerland, a village in the Canton of Bern
