= List of listed buildings in Ellon, Aberdeenshire =

This is a list of listed buildings in the parish of Ellon in Aberdeenshire, Scotland.

== List ==
Name	Location	Date Listed	Grid Ref. (Note: Sometimes known as OSGB36, the grid reference (where provided) is based on the British national grid reference system used by the Ordnance Survey. • "Guide to National Grid". Ordnance Survey. • "Get-a-map". Ordnance Survey.)	Geo-coordinates	Notes	LB Number (Note: Historic Environment Scotland assign a unique alphanumeric identifier to each designated site in Scotland, for listed buildings this always begins with "LB", for example "LB12345".)	Image
Ramornie Craigs Road				57°22′05″N 2°05′39″W	Category C(S)	31101	Upload Photo
Ellon Castle Park, Wall Or Deer Dykes				57°21′56″N 2°04′00″W	Category B	31103	Upload Photo
Esslemont House				57°21′52″N 2°06′51″W	Category B	9112	Upload Photo
Riversfield (Former Manse Of Ellon) Including Wall And Gate To Castle Road				57°21′54″N 2°04′06″W	Category B	31097	Upload Photo
Ellon Castle (Old)				57°22′02″N 2°04′07″W	Category B	31104	Upload Photo
Ellon Castle (Old) Sundial At Central Avenue Of Garden				57°21′59″N 2°04′05″W	Category A	31108	Upload Photo
Commercial Road Auchtercrag With Garden Urns And Gatepiers				57°22′03″N 2°05′19″W	Category B	31112	Upload Photo
Ellon Castle, Gatepiers On A 948				57°22′02″N 2°04′27″W	Category B	31102	Upload Photo
Hilton Of Turnerhall, Farmhouse				57°23′48″N 2°05′58″W	Category B	9108	Upload Photo
Old Bridge Of Ellon				57°21′48″N 2°04′23″W	Category A	31110	Upload another image
Boat Of Ardlethen Bridge Over River Ythan				57°22′04″N 2°07′36″W	Category C(S)	13713	Upload Photo
Boat Of Fechil Croft, By Ellon, Including Outbuildings And Boathouse				57°21′46″N 2°02′53″W	Category B	13340	Upload Photo
Nether Ardgrain, Farmhouse				57°23′46″N 2°04′48″W	Category A	9106	Upload another image
Hilton Steading (Excluding Later, Buildings In Court)				57°23′48″N 2°05′55″W	Category C(S)	9110	Upload Photo
Castle Of Esslemont				57°21′29″N 2°06′52″W	Category B	6740	Upload Photo
Ellon Parish Churchyard				57°21′53″N 2°04′11″W	Category C(S)	31096	Upload Photo
Davidson's (Shop And House) West Side Of Square				57°21′55″N 2°04′17″W	Category B	31099	Upload Photo
Ellon Castle (New)				57°22′01″N 2°03′57″W	Category B	31109	Upload Photo
Arnage Castle				57°25′25″N 2°06′36″W	Category B	9114	Upload Photo
Olrig (Former Free Manse) Station Road				57°21′55″N 2°04′35″W	Category B	31100	Upload Photo
Ellon Castle (Old) Sundial In Front Of, On Terrace				57°22′01″N 2°04′06″W	Category B	31105	Upload Photo
Ellon Castle (Old) Garden House And Stairs From Terrace To Garden				57°22′01″N 2°04′05″W	Category B	31106	Upload Photo
St. Mary On The Rock Episcopal Church, Ellon				57°21′42″N 2°04′18″W	Category A	31111	Upload another image
Old Bank House (4 Houses) Junction Of Square And Market Street				57°21′53″N 2°04′15″W	Category C(S)	31098	Upload Photo
Nethermill, Former Grain Mill				57°24′01″N 2°07′11″W	Category C(S)	9111	Upload Photo
Ellon Parish Church. (St. Mary)				57°21′53″N 2°04′13″W	Category C(S)	31094	Upload Photo
Ellon Castle (Old) Walled Garden				57°21′59″N 2°04′05″W	Category B	31107	Upload Photo
Doocot, Turner Hall				57°23′44″N 2°05′11″W	Category B	9107	Upload Photo
Hilton Windmill				57°23′49″N 2°05′55″W	Category B	9109	Upload Photo
Littlemill Of Esslemont				57°21′03″N 2°07′27″W	Category B	9113	Upload Photo

== Key ==
The scheme for classifying buildings in Scotland is:

- Category A: "buildings of national or international importance, either architectural or historic; or fine, little-altered examples of some particular period, style or building type."
- Category B: "buildings of regional or more than local importance; or major examples of some particular period, style or building type, which may have been altered."
- Category C: "buildings of local importance; lesser examples of any period, style, or building type, as originally constructed or moderately altered; and simple traditional buildings which group well with other listed buildings."

In March 2016 there were 47,288 listed buildings in Scotland. Of these, 8% were Category A, and 50% were Category B, with the remaining 42% being Category C.

== See also ==
- List of listed buildings in Aberdeenshire
