= Sheldon Warren Cheney =

American author and art critic

Sheldon Warren Cheney (June 29, 1886 – October 10, 1980) was an American author and art critic, born at Berkeley, California, the son of Lemuel Warren Cheney (1858–1921), California lawyer and writer, and May L. Cheney (1862–1942), Appointment Secretary at University of California, Berkeley for over forty years. At first he worked in his father's real estate business, later moving to Detroit where he founded the Theatre Arts Magazine in 1916 and edited it until 1921. Cheney was one of the most significant pro-modernist theatre and art critics of the early twentieth century. He helped introduce European modernist practices in theatre to the United States. His Theatre Arts Magazine promoted American little theatre activity, advocated for New Stagecraft design, and nurtured new American playwrights.

== Early years ==
Cheney grew up in Berkeley, California, in what he called "an atmosphere of literary ambition and activity". His father, Warren Cheney, was an author of poetry and fiction, and served as editor of the popular California magazine, Overland Monthly, and his mother, May L. Cheney, organized a teacher placement office at the University of California, Berkeley and was the founder of the National Association of Appointment Secretaries (NAAS) now known as the American College Personnel Association. The younger Cheney had a passion for the art of bookmaking and, while studying architecture at Berkeley, founded a quarterly journal for designers and collectors of bookplates—his first foray into the field of magazine publishing. He graduated in 1908 with a bachelor's degree in architecture. During his studies, Cheney also developed a love for theatre, inspired largely by performances of Greek drama he had attended at Berkeley's outdoor Hearst Greek Theatre. In the years immediately following his graduation, Cheney married Maud Maurice Turner and found intermittent work as an art and theatre critic.

In 1913, Cheney began studying drama at Harvard University. While there he attended the Boston installation of New York City's legendary Armory Show, an experience of modern art which fostered Cheney's growing fascination with new art and theatre. He began to write on the subject of modernism, and his first book, The New Movement in the Theatre, was published in 1914. It was around this time that Cheney decided to create a new journal focused on progressive ideas in the theatre.

== Later years ==
Cheney served as the main editor and writer for Theatre Arts Magazine from 1916 to 1921. Upon the October 1921 publication of the last issue of Volume V, Cheney removed himself from the editorial staff. He continued to contribute occasional articles for some years but was never again on the staff.

Cheney later remarked that he left in order to pursue professional theatre practice. He joined the Actor's Theatre in New York briefly, but there is no record of Cheney's actual participation in any professional work with the group.

After Cheney ceased editorship of Theatre Arts Magazine in 1921, he began writing more about modern art. His multiple editions of A Primer on Modern Art helped frame the discussion of modernist painting and sculpture until the 1950s.

In 1945, he departed from his usual vocation with his book, Men Who Have Walked with God, tracing mysticism through history, concentrating on eleven men from Lao-Tse and the Buddha to Jacob Boehme and William Blake.

He lived for many years in New Hope, Pennsylvania, then returned to his home town of Berkeley in 1976.

== Among his books are ==
- The New Movement in the Theatre (1914)
- Art-Lovers Guide to the Panama Pacific International Exposition (1915)
- The Art Theatre (1917)
- The Open Air Theatre (1918)
- Modern Art and the Theatre (1921)
- A Primer of Modern Art (1924)
- The New World Architecture (1930)
- Art and the Machine (1936)
- The Theatre (1929)
- Stage Decorations (1928)
- Expressionism in Art (1934)
- The Story of Modern Art (1941)
- Men Who Have Walked with God: Being the Story of Mysticism through the Ages Told in the Biographies of Representative Seers and Saints with Excerpts from Their Writings and Sayings (1945)
- Sculpture of the World: A History, The Viking Press, New York (1968)
- The Theatre: Three Thousand Years of Drama, Acting and Stagecraft, Longmans, Green and Co. (1929, 1952)
