= Saint-Germain-de-Joux =

Commune in Auvergne-Rhône-Alpes, France

- Commune
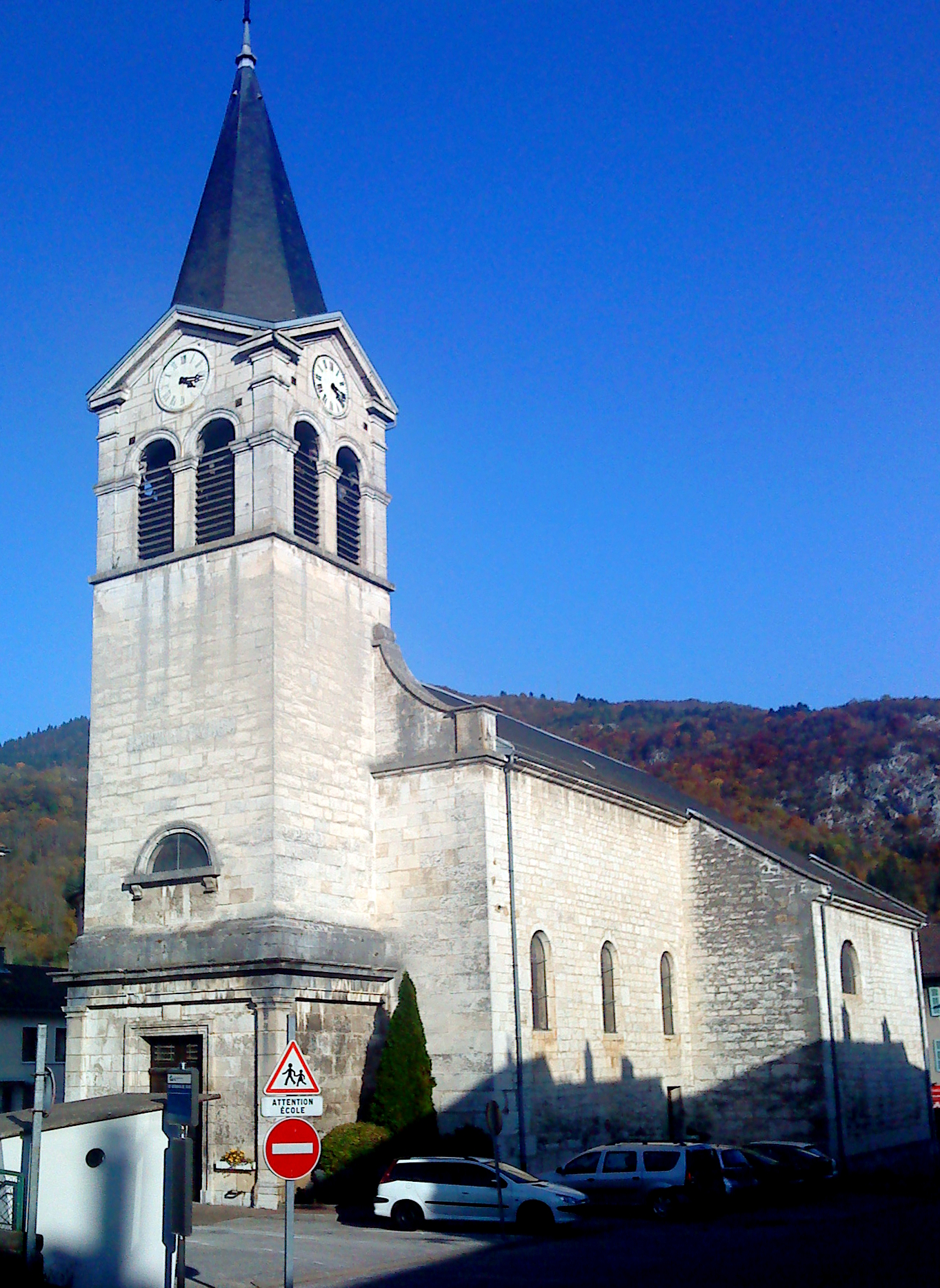
- Church of Saint Germain

- Coat of arms
- Location of Saint-Germain-de-Joux
- Location within France Location within Auvergne-Rhône-Alpes
- Coordinates: 46°11′00″N 5°44′00″E
- Country: France
- Region: Auvergne-Rhône-Alpes
- Department: Ain
- Arrondissement: Nantua
- Canton: Valserhône

Government
  - Mayor (2020–2026): Gilles Thomasset
- Area^{1}: 11.27 km^{2} (4.35 sq mi)
- Highest elevation: 1,091 m (3,579 ft)
- Lowest elevation: 420 m (1,380 ft)
- Population (2023): 507
  - Density: 45.0/km^{2} (117/sq mi)
- Time zone: UTC+01:00 (CET)
  - Summer (DST): UTC+02:00 (CEST)
- INSEE/Postal code: 01357 /01130
- ^{1} French Land Register data, which excludes lakes, ponds, glaciers > 1 km^{2} (0.386 sq mi or 247 acres) and river estuaries.

Saint-Germain-de-Joux (French pronunciation: [sɛ̃ ʒɛʁmɛ̃ də ʒu]) is a commune in the Ain department in eastern France.

== Population ==
Historical population
Year	Pop.	±% p.a.
1968	615	—
1975	546	−1.69%
1982	536	−0.26%
1990	465	−1.76%
1999	476	+0.26%
2007	501	+0.64%
2012	455	−1.91%
2017	501	+1.94%
2023	507	+0.20%
Source: INSEE

== See also ==
- Communes of the Ain department
