= Giron, Ain =

Commune in Auvergne-Rhône-Alpes, France

Giron
- Commune
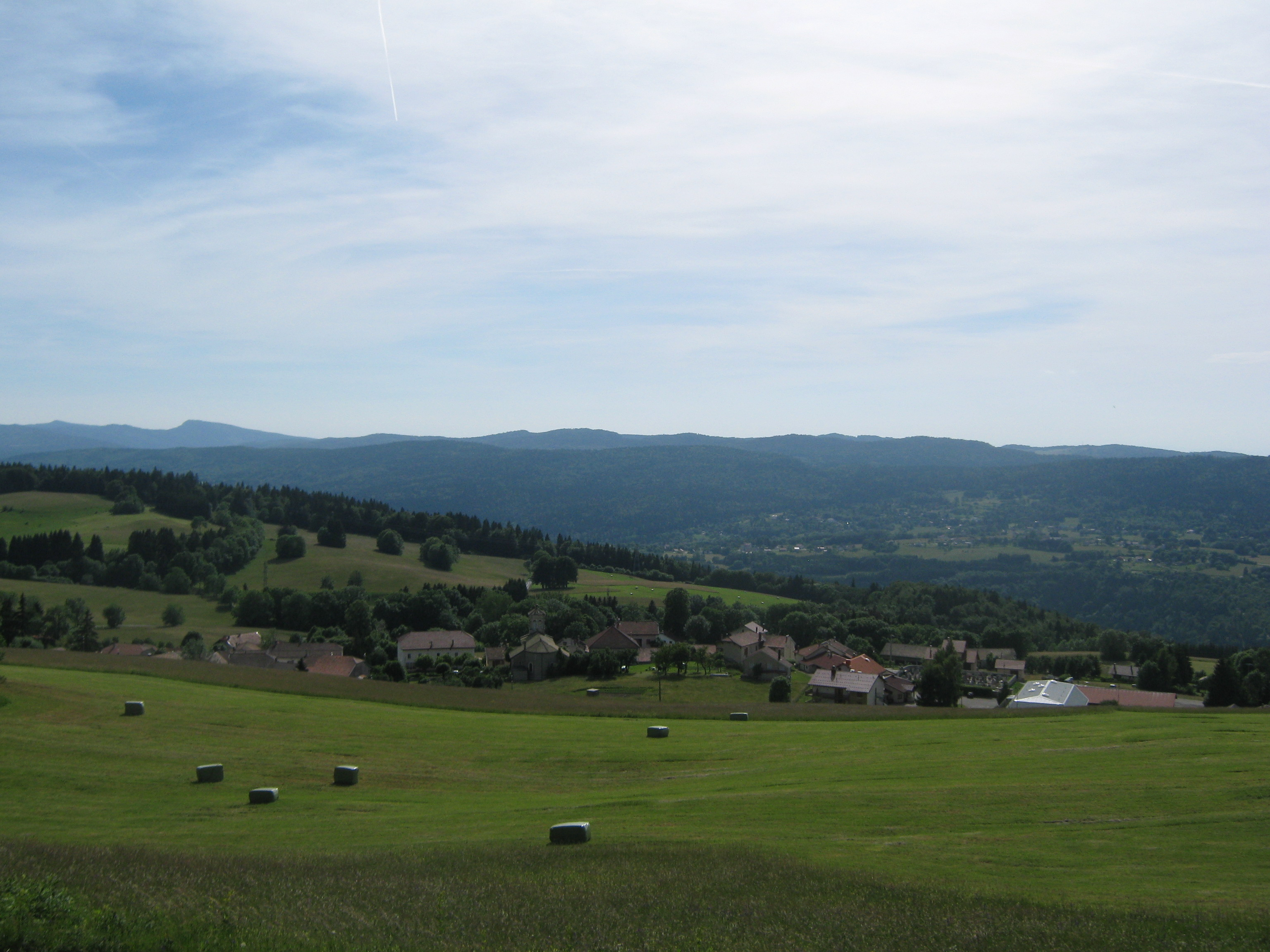
- Location of Giron
- Location within France Location within Auvergne-Rhône-Alpes
- Coordinates: 46°14′00″N 5°46′00″E
- Country: France
- Region: Auvergne-Rhône-Alpes
- Department: Ain
- Arrondissement: Nantua
- Canton: Valserhône

Government
  - Mayor (2026–32): Florian Moine
- Area^{1}: 9.39 km^{2} (3.63 sq mi)
- Elevation: 1,000 m (3,300 ft)
- Highest elevation: 1,206 m (3,957 ft)
- Lowest elevation: 779 m (2,556 ft)
- Population (2023): 174
  - Density: 18.5/km^{2} (48.0/sq mi)
- Time zone: UTC+01:00 (CET)
  - Summer (DST): UTC+02:00 (CEST)
- INSEE/Postal code: 01174 /01130
- ^{1} French Land Register data, which excludes lakes, ponds, glaciers > 1 km^{2} (0.386 sq mi or 247 acres) and river estuaries.

Giron (French pronunciation: [ʒiʁɔ̃]) is a commune in the Ain department in eastern France.

== Geography ==
=== Climate ===
Giron has an oceanic climate (Köppen climate classification Cfb). The average annual temperature in Giron is 8.4 °C (47.1 °F). The average annual rainfall is 1,672.4 mm (65.84 in) with December as the wettest month. The temperatures are highest on average in July, at around 17.1 °C (62.8 °F), and lowest in January, at around 0.3 °C (32.5 °F). The highest temperature ever recorded in Giron was 36.5 °C (97.7 °F) on 13 August 2003; the coldest temperature ever recorded was −23.0 °C (−9.4 °F) on 12 January 1987.

Climate data for Giron (1991−2020 normals, extremes 1986−2020)
Month	Jan	Feb	Mar	Apr	May	Jun	Jul	Aug	Sep	Oct	Nov	Dec	Year
Record high °C (°F)	15.0 (59.0)	17.0 (62.6)	20.5 (68.9)	24.3 (75.7)	29.1 (84.4)	34.5 (94.1)	33.8 (92.8)	36.5 (97.7)	29.5 (85.1)	26.7 (80.1)	19.4 (66.9)	17.0 (62.6)	36.5 (97.7)
Mean daily maximum °C (°F)	3.1 (37.6)	4.0 (39.2)	8.0 (46.4)	11.4 (52.5)	15.5 (59.9)	19.8 (67.6)	21.8 (71.2)	21.6 (70.9)	17.3 (63.1)	13.2 (55.8)	7.1 (44.8)	3.9 (39.0)	12.2 (54.0)
Daily mean °C (°F)	0.3 (32.5)	0.8 (33.4)	4.2 (39.6)	7.3 (45.1)	11.3 (52.3)	15.2 (59.4)	17.1 (62.8)	17.0 (62.6)	13.1 (55.6)	9.6 (49.3)	4.2 (39.6)	1.2 (34.2)	8.4 (47.1)
Mean daily minimum °C (°F)	−2.5 (27.5)	−2.4 (27.7)	0.3 (32.5)	3.2 (37.8)	7.0 (44.6)	10.6 (51.1)	12.5 (54.5)	12.4 (54.3)	9.0 (48.2)	6.1 (43.0)	1.3 (34.3)	−1.5 (29.3)	4.7 (40.5)
Record low °C (°F)	−23.0 (−9.4)	−19.5 (−3.1)	−18.0 (−0.4)	−8.0 (17.6)	−2.9 (26.8)	−2.0 (28.4)	3.0 (37.4)	3.5 (38.3)	0.4 (32.7)	−6.7 (19.9)	−11.0 (12.2)	−16.7 (1.9)	−23.0 (−9.4)
Average precipitation mm (inches)	165.8 (6.53)	140.0 (5.51)	138.8 (5.46)	112.2 (4.42)	144.8 (5.70)	120.1 (4.73)	115.6 (4.55)	122.0 (4.80)	121.7 (4.79)	150.0 (5.91)	164.1 (6.46)	177.3 (6.98)	1,672.4 (65.84)
Average precipitation days (≥ 1.0 mm)	13.1	12.3	12.3	10.8	13.4	10.4	9.9	10.4	10.3	11.9	12.3	14.4	141.6
Source: Météo-France

== Population ==
Historical population
Year	Pop.	±% p.a.
1968	118	—
1975	100	−2.34%
1982	99	−0.14%
1990	88	−1.46%
1999	100	+1.43%
2007	139	+4.20%
2012	168	+3.86%
2017	183	+1.73%
2023	174	−0.84%
Source: INSEE

== See also ==
- Communes of the Ain department
