= May L. Cheney =

American education administrator

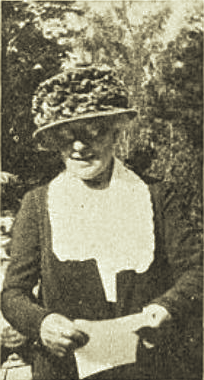
- Cheney in 1925
- Born: May Lucretia Shepard; 11 May 1862; Garden Grove Township, Decatur County, Iowa, United States
- Died: 22 April 1942 (aged 79); Berkeley, California, United States
- Education: University of California, Berkeley
- Occupation: Appointment Secretary at University of California, Berkeley
- Years active: 1888–1938
- Known for: The first president of National Association of Appointment Secretaries (NAAS) now known as the American College Personnel Association (ACPA).
- Spouse: Warren Cheney (m. 1883)
- Children: 4, including Sheldon Warren Cheney

May Lucretia Shepard Cheney (May 11, 1862 – April 22, 1942) was an American woman known for her close ties to the University of California, Berkeley, of which she was an alumna. She was the wife of Lemuel Warren Cheney (1858–1921), also a UC Berkeley alumnus.

== Early life and education ==
Cheney was born during the American Civil War in Garden Grove, Iowa, and was named after the month in which she was born, and her maternal grandmother who influenced her childhood. May's early school attendance was in her hometown. She attended high schools in Oakland and Chico, California before enrolling at UCB in 1879. With her widowed mother, she settled at 2020 Hearst Avenue (then College Way), in a house with a watermill in the rear yard. Residing in the same house was Lemuel Warren Cheney (1858–1921), a law student.

The following year, the Shepards moved to 2316 Allston Way, across the street from the campus. Before long, Cheney had moved there too. The Shepards' last address before May's graduation in 1883 was Club House No. 4 on the university grounds, again shared by Cheney, now a journalist. In addition to their shared living quarters, May and Lemuel had a common interest in literature. Both belonged to the Neolaean Literary Society, of which May was vice-president.

On 29 April 1883, during her senior year, she married Cheney, the Bachelor of Letters degree was granted to her in December of that year. They left for Europe, where he served as Balkan Peninsula correspondent for the San Francisco Chronicle. Their first son, Charles Henry Cheney, was born in Rome in February 1884. Upon their return she and her husband had a house built close to UCB, on College Avenue in Lodi.

== Career and adulthood ==
In 1886, when she was 24 years old, May founded Cheney's Pacific Coast Bureau of Education in San Francisco. It was the first commercial teacher placement agency west of the Rockies, and her husband participated in its management. She decided that UCB owed some obligation to the graduates unable to find proper positions. The English universities had appointment secretaries. Harvard University had a similar official. UCB, she thought, should likewise give such a service to students. After she convinced UCB President Martin Kellogg, her plan was accepted. She opened the UCB placement service in the president's office in South Hall on January 1, 1898, and continued to serve as the university's Appointment Secretary for 40 years, placing countless university graduates as high-school teachers throughout the state.

On August 4, 1919, Cheney was shot at by Roger Sprague, a chemistry assistant who was despondent at not being recommended for further advancement. She escaped unhurt.

=== Family ===
The Cheneys raised four sons, three of whom survived to adulthood. The eldest, Charles Henry Cheney (1884–1943), earned the first architectural degree awarded by UC before continuing his studies in Paris, eventually becoming a notable city planner and zoning expert. His son, Warren DeWitt Cheney (1907–1979), was a well-known sculptor and art teacher who took up psychology in midlife, founding the Transactional Analysis Journal. Sheldon Warren Cheney (1886–1980), entered his father's real estate business before moving to Detroit, where he became a notable author and art critic. In 1916 he founded Theatre Arts Magazine. Marshall Chipman Cheney (1888–1972) became a physician. He did his residency at Massachusetts General Hospital in Boston before returning to Berkeley, where he practiced near the campus and at Cowell Memorial Hospital. He lived with his widowed mother at 2241 College Avenue until 1940.

== Later life and legacy ==
At the end of 1939, May Cheney sold her two campus houses to the university, and the family soon moved to 116 Tunnel Road. The two Cheney houses on campus were designated City of Berkeley Landmarks in 1990. Built in 1885, 2241 College Avenue is the second oldest surviving structure in the Berkeley Property Tract.

May L. Cheney was the founder of the National Association of Appointment Secretaries (NAAS) now known as the American College Personnel Association.

In choosing a permanent home we seek that place above all others which promises abundance of life, stimulus, interests that postpone as long as possible the inevitable apathy of old age. Where do we find this precious boon more abundantly than in Berkeley?
