= Chesney =

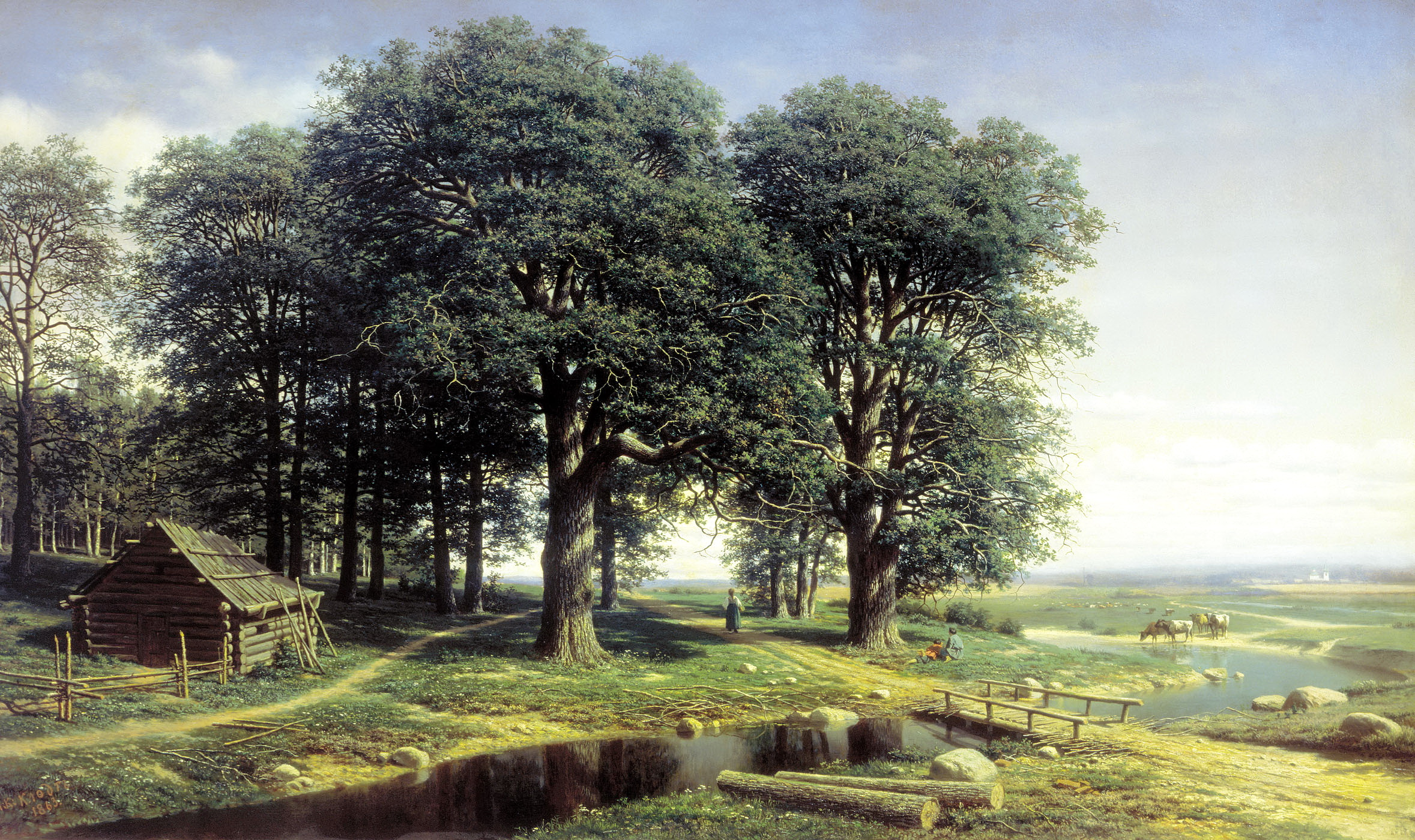
- An oak grove
- Language: Old French; Anglo-Norman French

Origin
- Meaning: "oak grove"
- Region of origin: Northwestern France, Center of France, United Kingdom

Chesney is an English surname or given name and a French surname It is derived from Old French chesnaie ("oak grove"). The name first reached England following its conquest by the Normans in 1066, the modern French spelling of the common name is chênaie (pronounced the same way) "oak grove". Notable persons with the name include:

As a surname:

- Bob Chesney (born 1977), American football coach
- Charles Cornwallis Chesney (1826–1876), British soldier and military writer
- Chester A. Chesney (1916–1986), American politician
- Dennis K. Chesney (active 1999–2000), American astronomer
- Francis Rawdon Chesney (1789–1872), British general and explorer
- Sir George Tomkyns Chesney (1830–1895), British general, politician, and author
- James Chesney (1934–1980), Irish priest and co-worker of IRA in Claudy bombing
- Kathleen Chesney (1899–1976), British scholar of medieval French literature
- Kenny Chesney (born 1968), American country music singer
- Marion Chesney (1936–2019), British novelist
- Maxine M. Chesney (born 1942), American judge
- Robert de Chesney (died 1166), Bishop of Lincoln
- Robert M. Chesney (born 1971), American law professor
- Ronald Chesney (1922–2018), British TV comedy screenwriter in Chesney and Wolfe
- Stanley Chesney (1918–1978), American soccer goalkeeper
- Andrew Chesney (1979), American singer/songwriter
- William de Chesney (died after 1161), brother of Robert de Chesney and a nobleman
- William de Chesney (sheriff) (died 1174), medieval sheriff of multiple counties
- Sir Francis Chesney and his son Jack, characters in 1892 British farce Charley's Aunt

As a given name:

- Chesney Allen (1894–1982), British entertainer
- Chesney Hawkes (born 1971), British pop singer
- Chesney Battersby-Brown (active since 2003), character on Coronation Street
- Chesney Snow (born 1979), American stage actor, musician and beat-boxer
- Chet Baker (1929–1988), American musician, born Chesney Henry Baker Jr.

As a nickname:

- Wojciech Szczęsny (born 1990), Polish football goalkeeper, given because of his surname

== See also ==
- Cheney (disambiguation)
- Chestney
- Chaney
