= Cheyney =

Cheyney may refer to:

== Places ==
- Cheyney, Pennsylvania, U.S.
- Cheyney University of Pennsylvania, American university
- Cheyney Court, Manydown, Hampshire, England

== People with the name ==
=== Surname ===
- George W. Cheyney (1854–1903), American businessman and politician
- Peter Cheyney (1896–1951), British writer
- Richard Cheyney (1513–1578), English bishop

=== Given name ===
- Cheyney McKnight, African-American historical interpreter

== See also ==
- Cheney (disambiguation)
