= Mount Kipp =

Mountain in Montana, United States

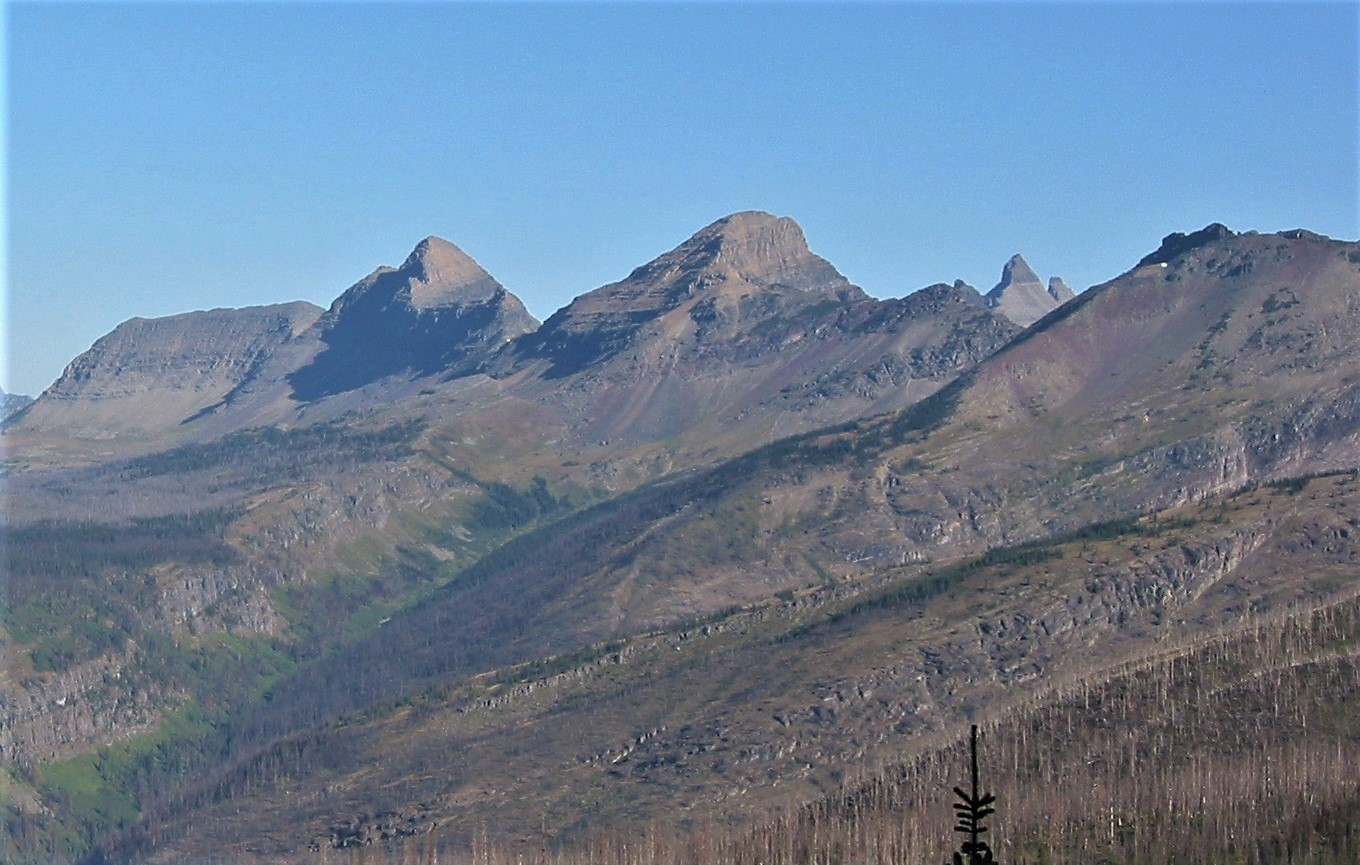
- Looking north at Mount Kipp (centered) and Cathedral Peak (left)

Highest point
- Elevation: 8,844 ft (2,696 m)
- Prominence: 1,279 ft (390 m)
- Coordinates: 48°51′22″N 113°50′26″W

Naming
- Etymology: Joe Kipp

Geography
- Location within Montana Location within the United States
- Location: Flathead County / Glacier County; Montana, U.S.
- Parent range: Lewis Range
- Topo map(s): USGS Ahern Pass, MT

Mount Kipp (8,844 feet (2,696 m)) is located in the Lewis Range, Glacier National Park in the U.S. state of Montana. Immediately east of the summit lies the retreating Chaney Glacier. Mount Kipp is situated along the Continental Divide. The mountain is presumed to have been named for Joe Kipp, a half-breed Indian trapper and scout who tried to prevent the Marias Massacre.

== Geology ==
Like other mountains in Glacier National Park, the peak is composed of sedimentary rock laid down during the Precambrian to Jurassic periods. Formed in shallow seas, this sedimentary rock was initially uplifted beginning 170 million years ago when the Lewis Overthrust fault pushed an enormous slab of precambrian rocks 3 mi (4.8 km) thick, 50 miles (80 km) wide and 160 miles (260 km) long over younger rock of the cretaceous period.

== Climate ==
Based on the Köppen climate classification, the peak is located in an alpine subarctic climate zone with long, cold, snowy winters, and cool to warm summers. Temperatures can drop below −10 °F with wind chill factors below −30 °F.

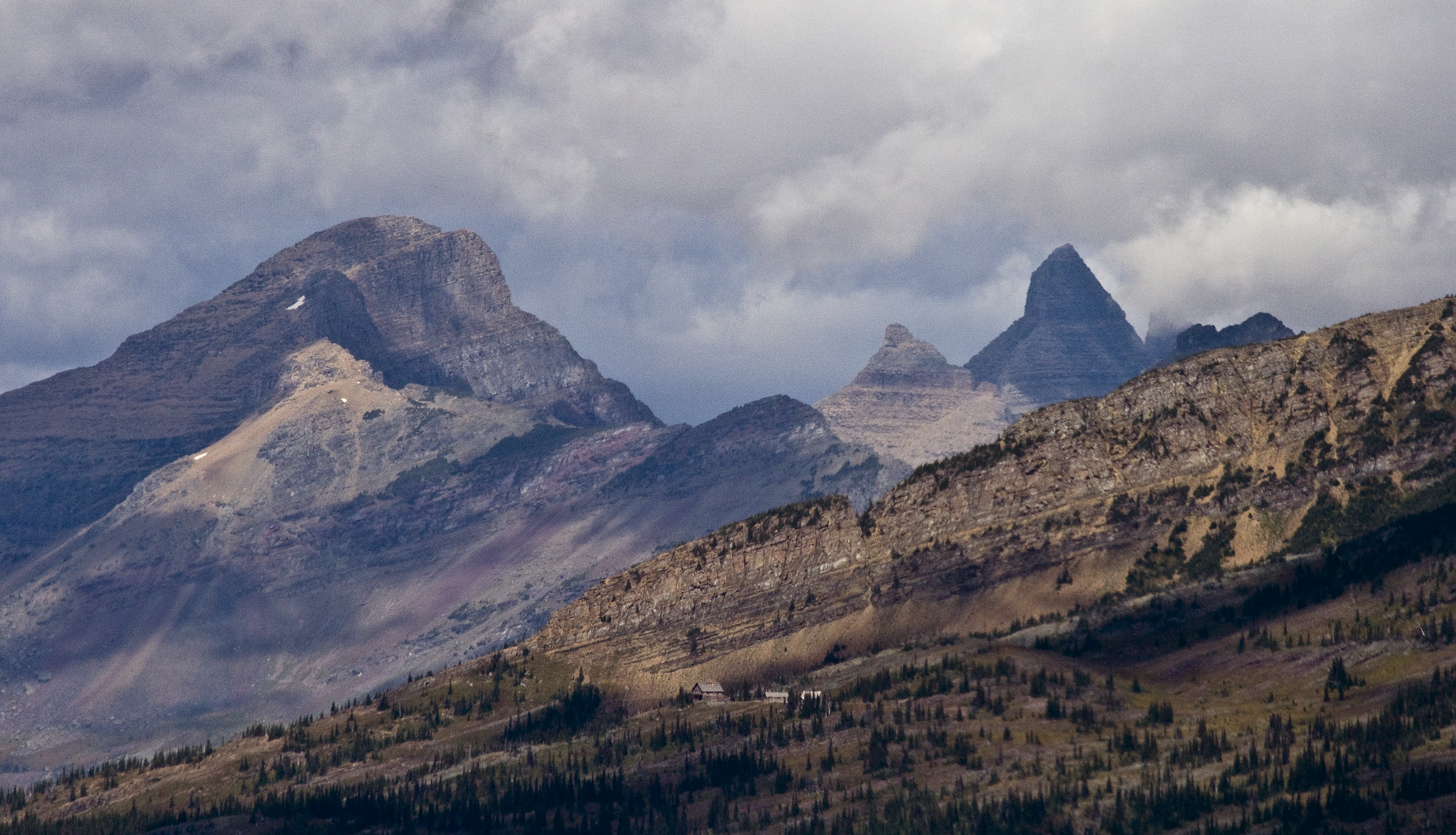
Mt. Kipp on the left, Granite Park Chalet centered at bottom, with Stoney Indian Peaks to the right

== See also ==
- Mountains and mountain ranges of Glacier National Park (U.S.)
