= Canton of Valserhône =

Coordinates: 46°06′30″N 5°49′36″E

Valserhône
- Canton
- Interactive map of Valserhône
- Country: France
- Region: Auvergne-Rhône-Alpes
- Department: Ain
- No. of communes: {{{nbcomm}}}
- Area: 220.15 km^{2} (85.00 sq mi)
- Population (2023): 22,235
  - Density: 101.00/km^{2} (261.59/sq mi)
- INSEE code: 01 03

The canton of Valserhône (before March 2020: canton of Bellegarde-sur-Valserine) is an administrative division in eastern France. At the French canton reorganisation which came into effect in March 2015, the canton was expanded from 12 to 15 communes (2 of which were merged into the new communes Surjoux-Lhopital and Valserhône):

1. Billiat
2. Champfromier
3. Chanay
4. Confort
5. Giron
6. Injoux-Génissiat
7. Montanges
8. Plagne
9. Saint-Germain-de-Joux
10. Surjoux-Lhopital
11. Valserhône
12. Villes

== Demographics ==
Historical population
Year	Pop.	±% p.a.
2013	21,056	—
2018	21,898	+0.79%
Source: INSEE

== See also ==
- Cantons of the Ain department
- Communes of France
