= Montanges =

Commune in Auvergne-Rhône-Alpes, France

- Commune
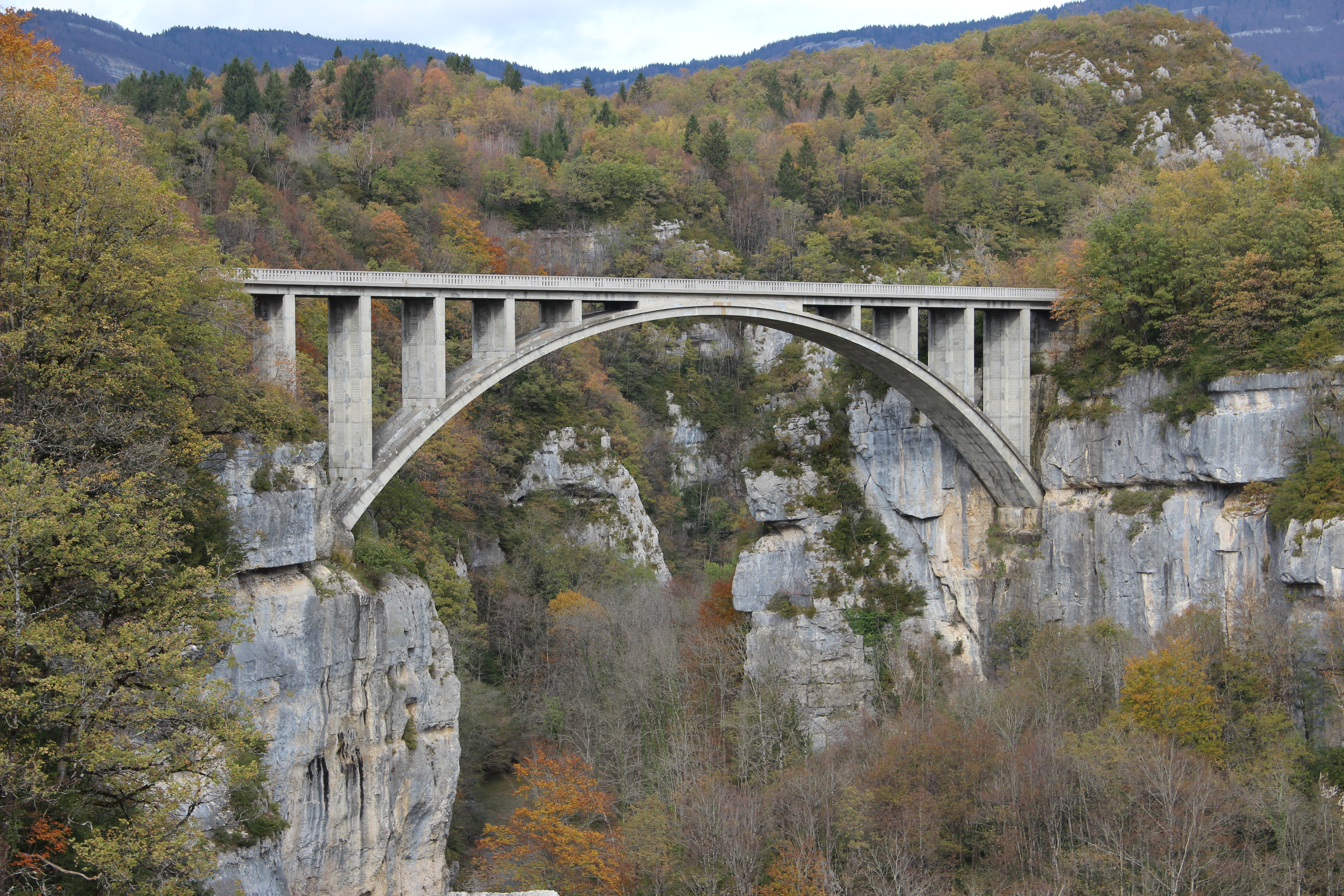
- Stone bridge
- Location of Montanges
- Location within France Location within Auvergne-Rhône-Alpes
- Coordinates: 46°09′54″N 5°48′08″E
- Country: France
- Region: Auvergne-Rhône-Alpes
- Department: Ain
- Arrondissement: Nantua
- Canton: Valserhône
- Intercommunality: Terre Valserhône

Government
  - Mayor (2026–32): Christophe Marquet
- Area^{1}: 13.70 km^{2} (5.29 sq mi)
- Highest elevation: 1,090 m (3,580 ft)
- Lowest elevation: 375 m (1,230 ft)
- Population (2023): 369
  - Density: 26.9/km^{2} (69.8/sq mi)
- Time zone: UTC+01:00 (CET)
  - Summer (DST): UTC+02:00 (CEST)
- INSEE/Postal code: 01257 /01200
- ^{1} French Land Register data, which excludes lakes, ponds, glaciers > 1 km^{2} (0.386 sq mi or 247 acres) and river estuaries.

Montanges (French pronunciation: [mɔ̃tɑ̃ʒ]) is a commune in the Ain department in eastern France.

== Population ==
Historical population
Year	Pop.	±% p.a.
1968	226	—
1975	192	−2.30%
1982	191	−0.07%
1990	248	+3.32%
1999	282	+1.44%
2007	331	+2.02%
2012	333	+0.12%
2017	344	+0.65%
2023	369	+1.18%
Source: INSEE

== See also ==
- Communes of the Ain department
