= John Cheyne =

John Cheyne may refer to:

- Sir John Cheyne (speaker) (died 1414), speaker of the House of Commons
- John Cheyne (MP for Buckinghamshire) (died c.1447), member of parliament (MP) for Buckinghamshire, 1413, 1415, 1425 and 1427
- Sir John Cheyne (builder of Chenies Manor) in Chenies, Buckinghamshire c.1460
- Sir John Cheyne (died 1467), (1410–1467), MP for Kent
- Sir John Cheyne (died 1468) (c.1390–1468), MP for Buckinghamshire, 1421 to 1445
- John Cheyne (died 1585), MP for Chipping Wycombe
- John Cheney (gentleman at arms) (died 1567), MP for Dover, Winchelsea and Berkshire
- John Cheyne, Baron Cheyne (c. 1442–1499), Master of the Horse to Edward IV of England
- John Cheyne (physician) (1777–1836), British physician, surgeon and author
- Sir John Cheyne (advocate) (1841–1907), Scottish advocate

== See also ==
- John Cheney (disambiguation)
- John Chaney (disambiguation)
