= Chestney =

Chestney is a surname. Notable people with this surname include:

- Jamie Chestney (born 1986), British lawn and indoor bowler, husband of Natalie
- Lillian Chestney (1913–2000), American illustrator and painter
- Natalie Chestney, married name of Natalie Melmore (born 1989), British lawn bowler

== See also ==
- Chesney
