= Cheneyville =

Cheneyville may refer to a place in the United States:

- Cheneyville, Illinois
- Cheneyville, Louisiana

== See also ==
- Chaneyville, Maryland
