= Michael Cieply =

American journalist

Michael Cieply (born 1951) is an entertainment industry writer, first for The Wall Street Journal and then for Talk magazine and as a media correspondent for The New York Times. Here he covers Hollywood for the media desk. He joined The New York Times in 2004, as a movie editor.

For eight and a half years in the 1990s, he worked as a film producer for Sony, where he was producing or trying to produce movies and TV programs. While there, Cieply would consult with Ray Stark Productions. He was a production executive for a number of companies, including ABC, Columbia Pictures, Disney, Fox, Universal, and United Airlines. Cieply also was an editor and reporter for the Los Angeles Times, where he covered entertainment and media for the business section and for various publications such as Forbes magazine and The Wall Street Journal.

He was a staff editor in the Culture section of The New York Times. Cieply was the West Coast editor of Inside.com, a website covering the media and entertainment industries. He has covered entertainment for over 17 years. He moved to Deadline Hollywood in 2016.

== Book ==
- The Hearsts: Family and Empire with Lindsay Chaney (1981 Simon & Schuster)

== Sources ==
- Frontline interview
