= Tom Cheney =

Tom or Thomas Cheney may refer to:

- Thomas Cheney (c. 1485–1558), Lord Warden of the Cinque Ports
- Thomas Cheyney (priest) (1694–1760), Church of England priest
- Thomas C. Cheney (1868–1957), Vermont politician and attorney
- Thomas Cheney (folklorist) (1901–1993), Mormon folklorist
- Tom Cheney (baseball) (1934–2001), pitcher who set the all-time record for strikeouts in a single game
- Tom Cheney (cartoonist) (born 1954), cartoonist who writes for The New Yorker and MAD Magazine
- Tom Chaney, a character in True Grit
