= Arnage railway station =

Disused railway station in Arnage, Aberdeenshire

Arnage
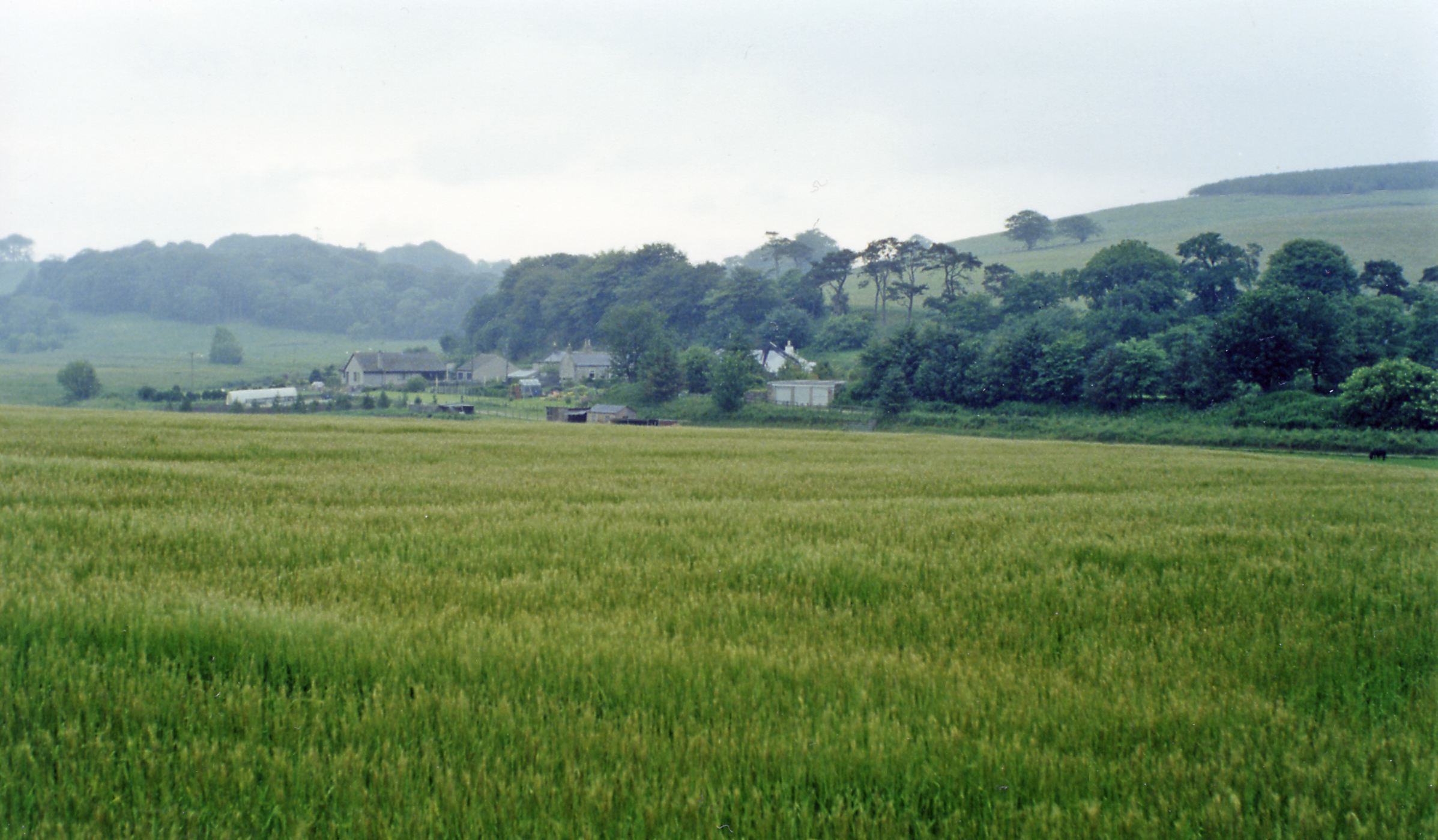
- Site of the former station in 1997

General information
- Location: Arnage, Aberdeenshire; Scotland
- Coordinates: 57.416°N 2.114°W
- Platforms: 2

Other information
- Status: Disused

History
- Original company: Formartine and Buchan Railway
- Pre-grouping: Great North of Scotland Railway
- Post-grouping: London and North Eastern Railway

Key dates
- 18 July 1861: Station opened
- 4 October 1965: Station closed
Location

Arnage railway station was a railway station in Arnage, Aberdeenshire.

== History ==
The station was opened on 18 July 1861 by the Formartine and Buchan Railway. On the northbound platform was the station building and on the west side was the goods yard. Two signal boxes opened in 1890: north and south. The north signal box was on the north side of the northbound platform and the south signal box was on the west side of the goods yard. The north box was downgraded to a ground frame in 1902 and control passed to the south box. The station closed on 4 October 1965. The signal boxes closed along with it. The station building is now a house.

Preceding station	Disused railways	Following station
Ellon	Great North of Scotland Railway; Formartine and Buchan Railway	Auchnagatt
