= John Cheney =

John Cheney may refer to:

- John Cheyne (speaker), (died 1414) a.k.a. John Cheney
- John Cheyne, Baron Cheyne, also written John Cheney, Baron Cheney
- John Cheney (gentleman at arms), 16th century gentleman at arms, politician and murderer
- John Cheney (engraver) (1801–1885), American engraver
- John Moses Cheney (1859–1922), American judge
- John Sherwood Cheney (1827–1910), American businessman and politician
- John Vance Cheney (1848–1922), American librarian

== See also ==
- John Cheyne (disambiguation)
- John Chaney (disambiguation)
