= Margaret Cheney =

Margaret Cheney may refer to:

- Margaret Cheney (mathematician) (born 1955), professor at Colorado State University
- Margaret Cheney (politician) (born 1952), Vermont representative and journalist
- Margaret Cheney (author) (1921–2010), biographer of Tesla and others
- Margaret Cheney (1628 – c. 1690) of Roxbury, Massachuetts, married to Thomas Hastings (colonist)
- Margaret Cheney, "after Lady Bulmer by untrue matrimony" (died 1537), executed for treason following Bigod's rebellion
