= Lindsay Chaney =

News editor (born 1951)

Lindsay Chaney (born in 1951) is a senior news editor at Variety.

He joined Variety in 1999. Previously he was a business editor and writer at the Long Beach Press-Telegram, covering the aerospace industry and finance. He has written for the Los Angeles Times, New York Times and Los Angeles magazine. He is the co-author, with Michael Cieply, of a book about the heirs of William Randolph Hearst entitled The Hearsts: Family and Empire, published by Simon & Schuster. Chaney, an editor at the Los Angeles Herald Examiner before it folded in 1989, had access to original Hearst documents and letters. they were also able to interview Hearst's sons and other close relatives and colleagues.

Chaney and Cieply portrayed William Randolph Hearst as a man who stunted his sons' lives, stopping them from going further in college than he had been able to do, giving them elaborate job titles and grand salaries but no real authority, mocking their ideas for the family business, and writing a will that put the family assets into a trust over which they had no authority.

Chaney attended the University of Michigan and was an editor of The Michigan Daily.

In 1975 when the journalists at the Herald Examiner won the right to form a union, Cheney was vice-president of the local.

Chaney was spokesman for the Committee that organized the 1984 Summer Olympics in Los Angeles.

== Book ==
- The Hearsts: Family and Empire with Michael Cieply
