= Peter Cheney =

Canadian writer

Peter Cheney is a feature writer for the Canadian newspaper The Globe and Mail.

Cheney formerly wrote for the Toronto Star.

He is the winner of three National Newspaper Awards:

- 1991: International Reporting, Toronto Star
- 1994: Enterprise Reporting, Toronto Star
- 1998: Enterprise Reporting, Toronto Star
