= Arnage Castle =

Castle in Aberdeenshire, Scotland

Coordinates: 57.4237°N 2.1098°W

Arnage Castle is a country house, incorporating a Z-plan tower house, located around 4 miles (6.4 km) north of Ellon, in Arnage, Aberdeenshire, north-east Scotland. The tower house dates from the late 16th century, and was extended in subsequent centuries.

== History ==
The Cheyne family acquired the land of Arnage through marriage towards the end of the 14th century. The Cheynes built the tower house, but it was sold by the last of the family to John Sibbald in 1643.

Baillie John Ross bought it in 1702. Subsequently he became provost of Aberdeen, where his 16th-century town house has been restored. The family owned Arnage until recently, latterly under the name Leith-Ross. The economist Sir Frederick Leith-Ross (1887–1968) spent his childhood at Arnage Castle. In 1996 Arnage became the home of oil millionaire Gareth Jones who completed extensive renovation work on it over a period of 15 years.

The present castle was built on the site of an older keep. The 16th-century tower house was the work of the architect Thomas Leper or Leiper, and features distinctive triple shot holes which are also found at Tolquhon Castle. Additional wings were added to the castle in 1860, designed by the architect James Matthews of Aberdeen. Further additions were made in the 1960s. Arnage is still occupied, and is a category B listed building.

== Structure ==
The tower house is of three storeys, with an extra storey in the stair wing. The original entrance was on the first floor, but this has been built up. The basement is vaulted, and the hall is on the first floor, though an original stair from the basement wine cellar to the hall no longer exists. There are two turnpike stairs, with conical turrets, in the re-entrant angle of the main block and the stair wing. Another turret gives access to the garret.
