= Arnage, Aberdeenshire =

Coordinates: 57.4400°N 2.0750°W

Eredine
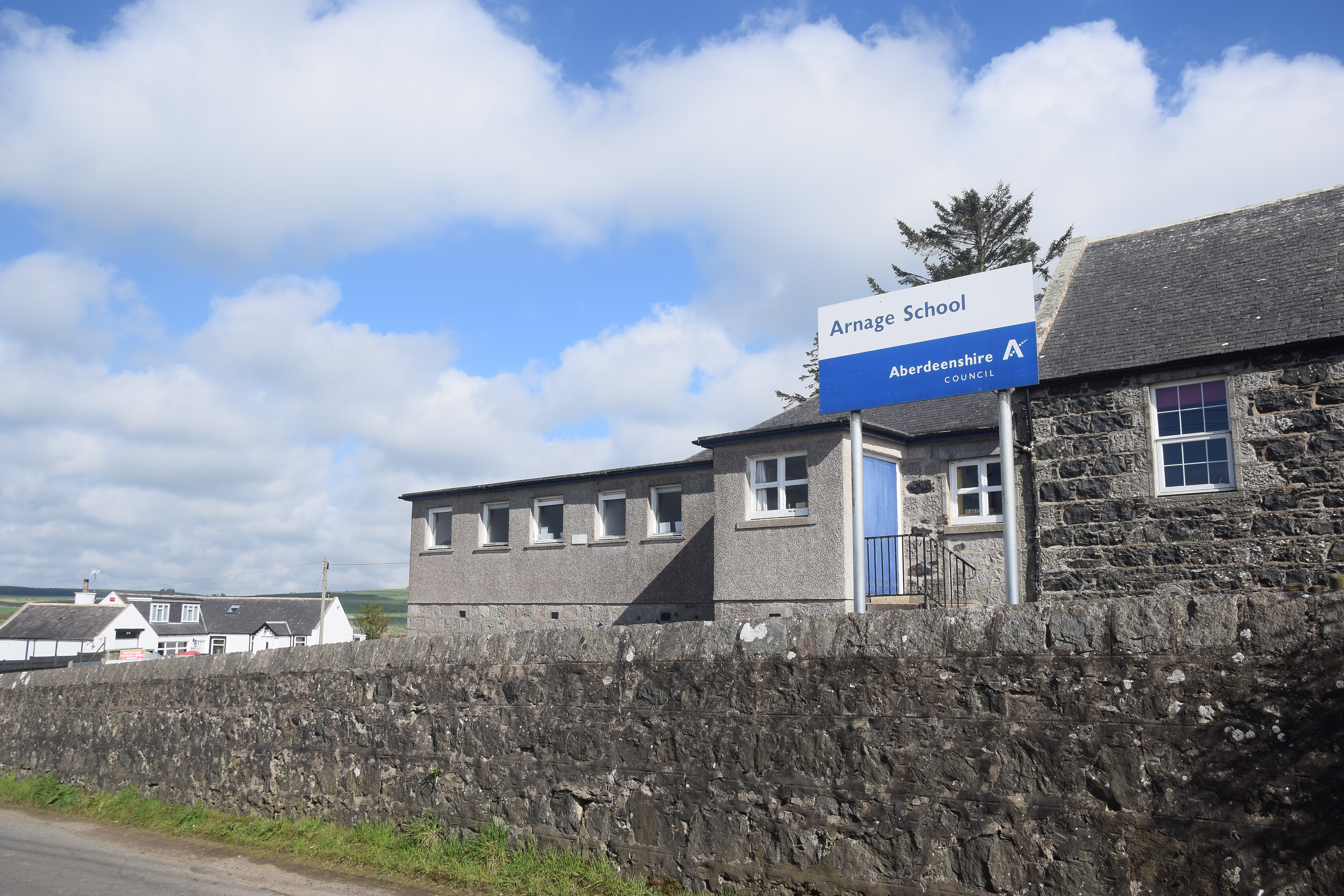
- Arnage Primary School

- Location within Aberdeenshire
- Council area: Aberdeenshire
- Country: Scotland
- Sovereign state: United Kingdom
- Police: Scotland
- Fire: Scottish
- Ambulance: Scottish

Arnage is a small village in Aberdeenshire. It is located to the north of Ellon.

New Arc Wildlife Rescue is a wildlife rescue centre located in Arnage. After centuries of ownership by the Cheyne and Ross families, it was bought by Donald Charles Stewart in 1937.

== History ==
Arnage Castle is a tower house castle that dates in part to the late 16th century. It is Category B listed and was remodelled in the late 17th and early 18th centuries. The castle was owned by the Cheynes family and then by the Rosses of Auchlossan from 1702.

== Education ==
Arnage has a primary school in the village.

== Transport ==
Arnage railway station was a railway station that served the area on the Formartine and Buchan Railway. It opened 1865 but closed in 1965.
