= Plagne, Ain =

Commune in Auvergne-Rhône-Alpes, France

Plagne
- Commune
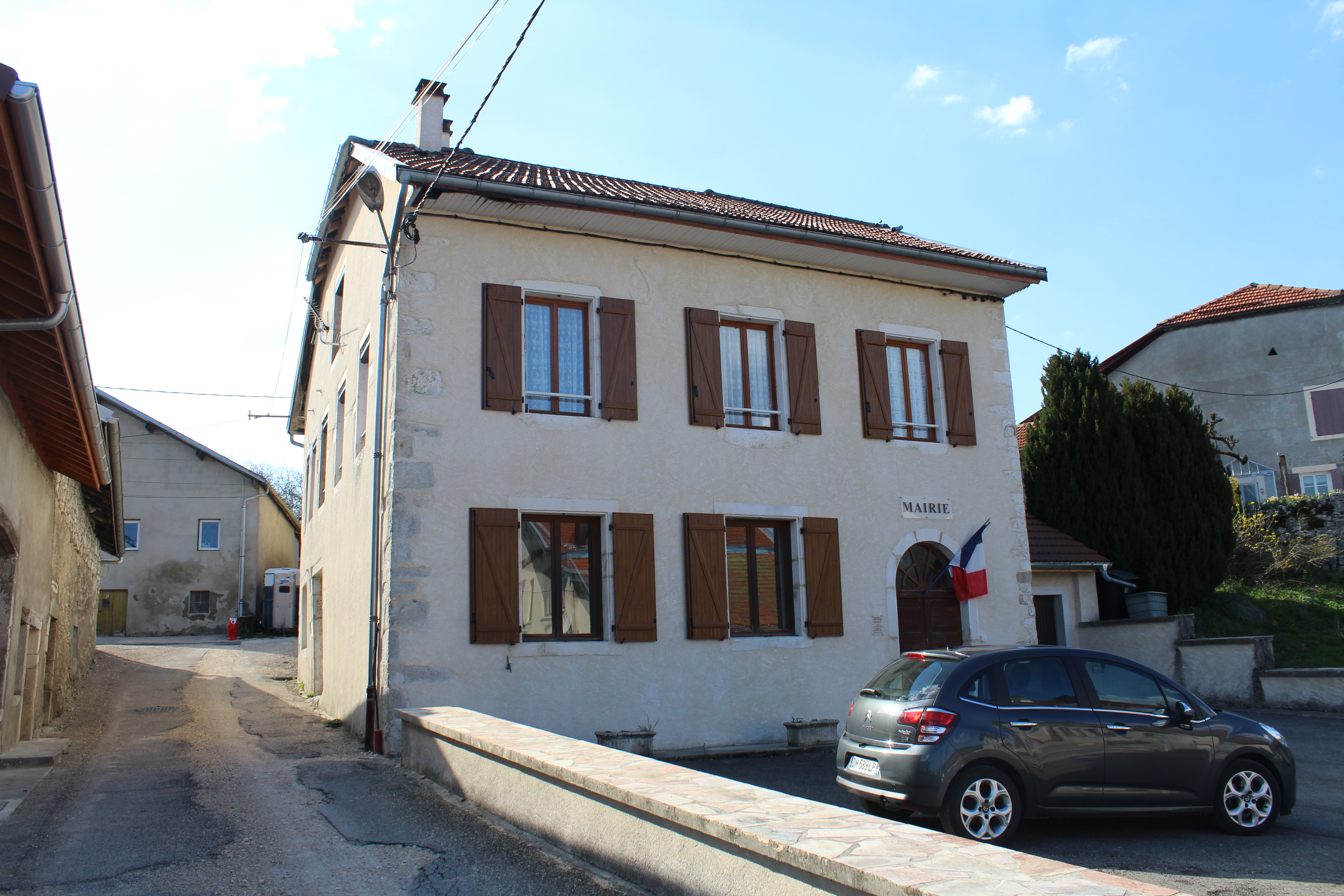
- Town hall
- Location of Plagne
- Location within France Location within Auvergne-Rhône-Alpes
- Coordinates: 46°11′37″N 5°43′36″E
- Country: France
- Region: Auvergne-Rhône-Alpes
- Department: Ain
- Arrondissement: Nantua
- Canton: Valserhône
- Intercommunality: Terre Valserhône

Government
  - Mayor (2026–32): Philippe Dinocheau
- Area^{1}: 6.20 km^{2} (2.39 sq mi)
- Elevation: 770 m (2,530 ft)
- Highest elevation: 922 m (3,025 ft)
- Lowest elevation: 560 m (1,840 ft)
- Population (2023): 159
  - Density: 25.6/km^{2} (66.4/sq mi)
- Time zone: UTC+01:00 (CET)
  - Summer (DST): UTC+02:00 (CEST)
- INSEE/Postal code: 01298 /01130
- ^{1} French Land Register data, which excludes lakes, ponds, glaciers > 1 km^{2} (0.386 sq mi or 247 acres) and river estuaries.

Plagne (French pronunciation: [plaɲ]) is a commune in the Ain department in eastern France.

== Population ==
Historical population
Year	Pop.	±% p.a.
1968	74	—
1975	58	−3.42%
1982	61	+0.72%
1990	73	+2.27%
1999	83	+1.44%
2007	94	+1.57%
2012	134	+7.35%
2017	132	−0.30%
2023	159	+3.15%
Source: INSEE

== See also ==
- Communes of the Ain department
