= Chaney Glacier =

Glacier in Montana, United States

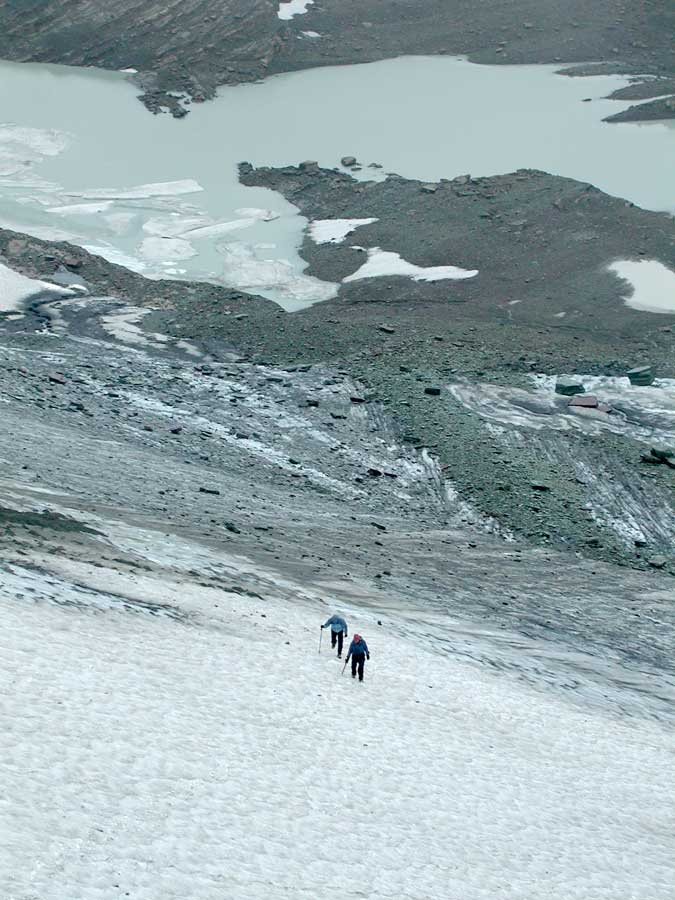
- Researchers traverse Chaney Glacier in 2004

- Location within Montana
- Type: Cirque glacier
- Location: Glacier National Park, Glacier County, Montana, U.S.
- Coordinates: 48°51′06″N 113°49′48″W
- Area: 93 acres (0.38 km^{2}) in 2005
- Length: .20 m (7.9 in)
- Terminus: Talus
- Status: Retreating

Chaney Glacier is in Glacier National Park in the U.S. state of Montana. The glacier is situated in a cirque to the southeast of Mount Kipp on the eastern side of the Continental Divide. Chaney Glacier is one of several glaciers that have been selected for monitoring by the U.S. Geological Survey's Glacier Monitoring Research program, which is researching changes to the mass balance of glaciers in and surrounding Glacier National Park. The glacier is being monitored using remote sensing equipment and repeat photography, where images of the glacier are taken from identical locations periodically.

Since 1911, Chaney glacier has retreated considerably. Between 1966 and 2005, the glacier lost over 29 percent of its surface area. The repeat photographs below document the changes to the glacier from 1911 to 2005.

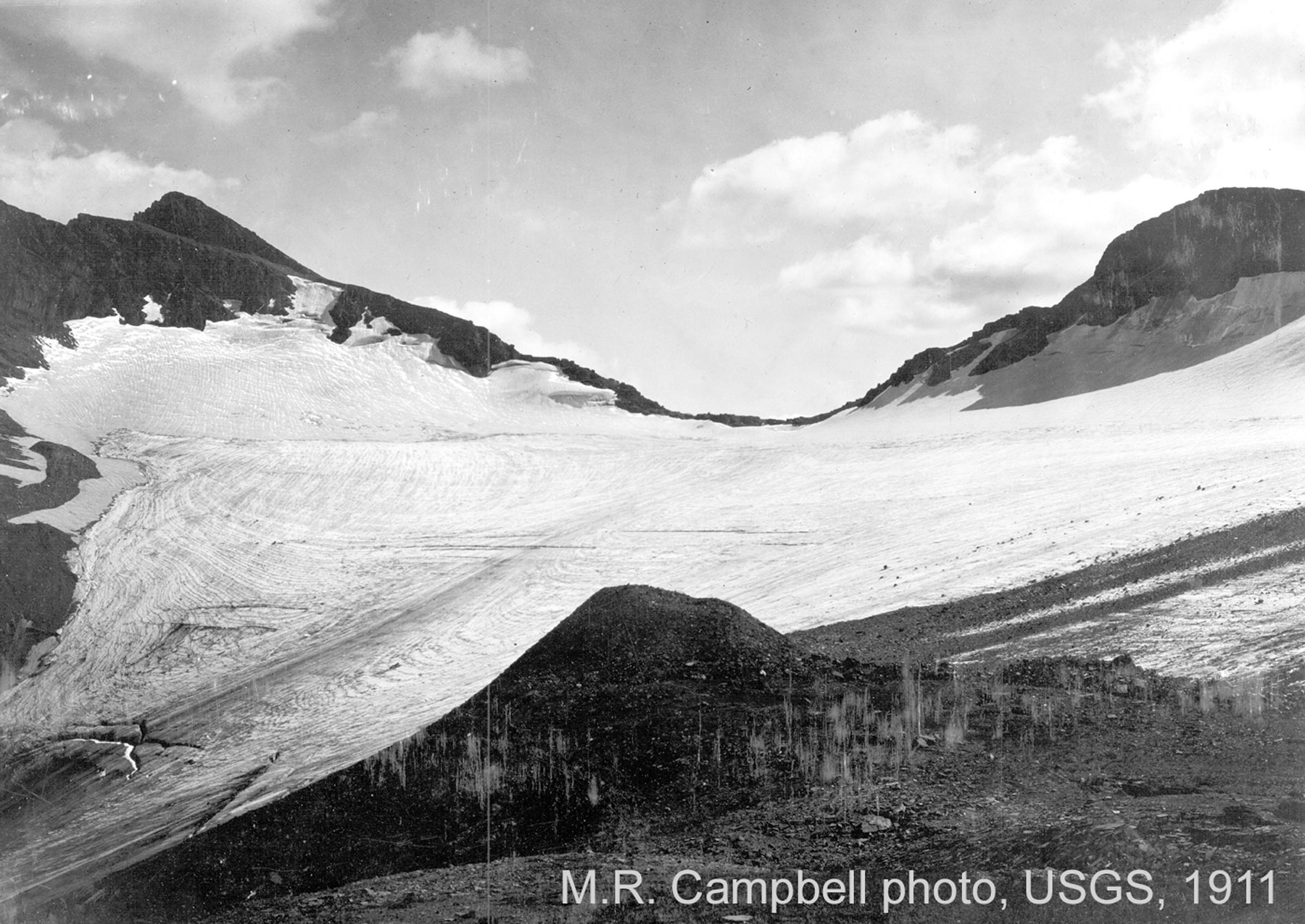
Chaney Glacier in 1911

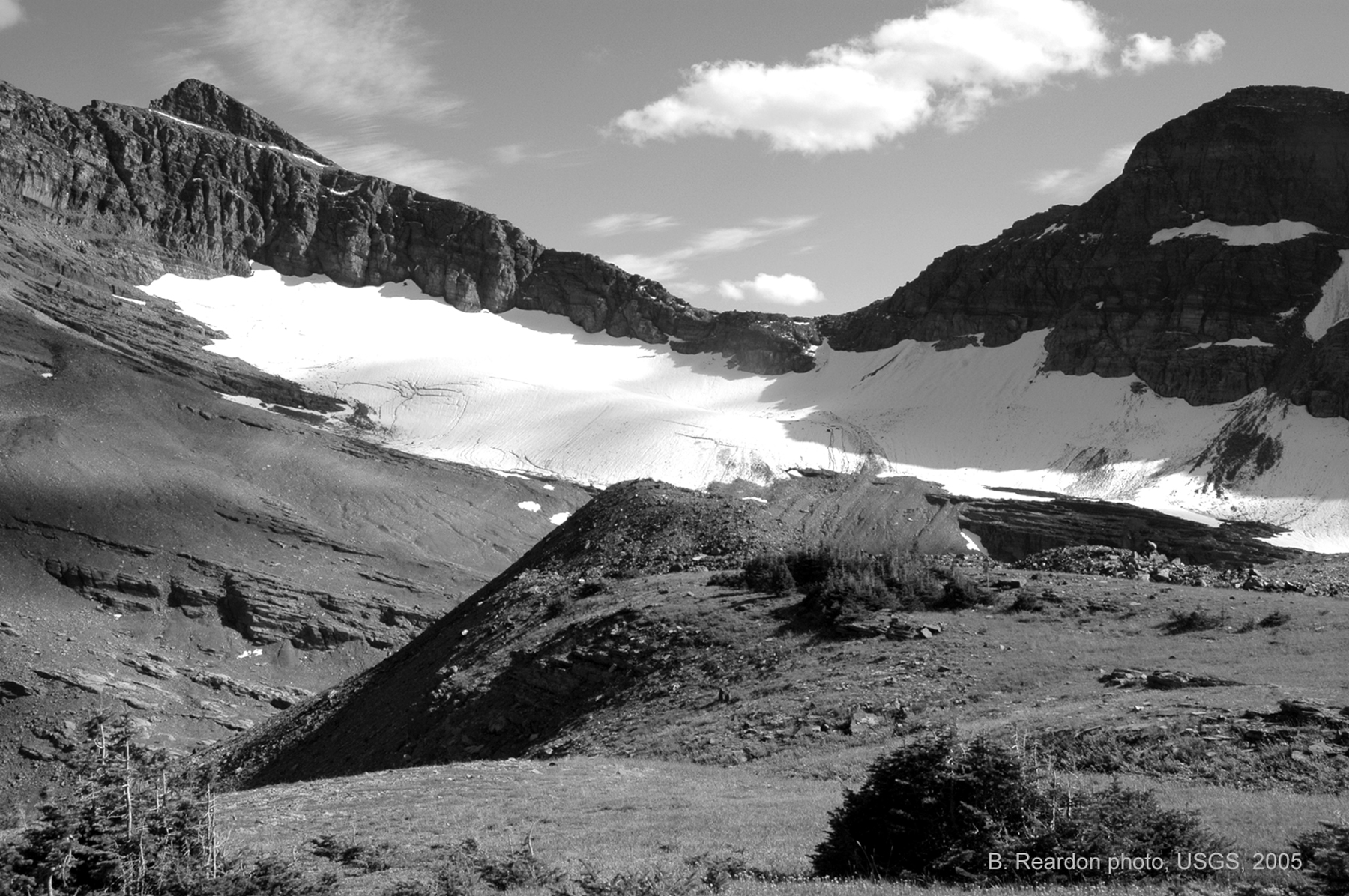
Chaney glacier in 2005

== See also ==
- List of glaciers in the United States
- Glaciers in Glacier National Park (U.S.)
