= American College Personnel Association =

Educational administration

- Abbreviation: ACPA
- Type: NGO

American College Personnel Association - College Student Educators International is a major student affairs association headquartered in Washington, D.C. at the National Center for Higher Education.

Founded in 1924 by May L. Cheney, ACPA has 7,500 members representing 1,200 private and public institutions from across the U.S. and around the world. Members include organizations and companies that are engaged in the campus marketplace. Members also include graduate and undergraduate students enrolled in student affairs/higher education administration programs, faculty, and student affairs professionals, from entry level to senior student affairs officers.

== Annual convention ==
Nearly 50% of ACPA's members attend the convention. Highlights of the convention include pre-convention workshops, over 300 educational sessions, interviewing at the , volunteering and networking opportunities. During the convention, job applicants and employers participate in one of the largest and most comprehensive placement service in student affairs. The 2013 convention will be in Las Vegas (2013), chaired by Karen Warren-Coleman (University of Chicago).

The 2012 Louisville Convention was chaired by Steve Sutton (University of California at Berkeley). Past convention chairs include Patricia Perillo (Virginia Polytechnic Institute & State University) for 2011, Robin Diana (Hartwick College) for 2010, Jonathan Poullard (University of California at Berkeley) for 2009, and Sue Saunders (University of Connecticut) for 2008.

== History ==
1924 - May L. Cheney, who organized a teacher placement office at the University of California, Berkeley helped form the National Association of Appointment Secretaries (NAAS). In 1924, NAAS met for the first time and came as guests of the National Association of Deans of Women (NADW) to a convention sponsored by the Department Superintendence of the National Education Association.

1929 - Forty-six NAAS members registered for the Sixth Annual Convention. NAAS became the National Association of Personnel and Placement Officers (NAPPO).

1930s - The name American College Personnel Association (ACPA) was adopted in 1931. Association communication consisted of one mailed newsletter, the Personnel-O-Gram (P-O-G). In 1937, the Student Point of View statement was developed by leaders of the American Council on Education (ACE) and ACPA.

1940s - The Journal for Educational and Psychological Measurement (EPM) became the next form of the association's newsletter communication in 1943. In 1947, ACPA's President Daniel D. Feder's recommendation for formal unification efforts led to the formation of the American Personnel and Guidance Association (APGA). No conferences were held from 1943 through 1945 during World War Two.

1950s - The Personnel and Guidance Journal replaced EPM as ACPA's official journal in 1952. ACPA members approved the plan to form APGA. Membership reached 1,000 in 1952 and continued to increase through the next two decades. In 1959, Charles Lewis, the P-O-G associate editor was named the first editor of the Journal of College Student Personnel, ACPA's new official journal.

1970s - ACPA collaborated with other national organizations on many national conventions. In 1973, ACPA and NAWDC (formerly NADW) coordinated a national convention. The Standing Committee for Women was established in 1973. In 1974, NAWDAC (name change for NAWDC), NASPA and ACPA coordinated a national convention. In 1976, membership totaled 9,384 at a record high. The Standing Committee for Multicultural Affairs was founded in 1978. In 1979, ACPA became one of the first members of the Council for the Advancement of Standards in Higher Education (CAS).

1980s - ACPA flourished under the presidential leadership of outstanding student affairs practitioners and faculty members such as Susan Komives, Margaret "Peggy" Barr and Dennis Roberts. In 1983, ACPA was incorporated under the District of Columbia Non-Profit Act. In 1987, ACPA and NASPA held a joint meeting in Chicago to celebrate the 50th Anniversary of The Student Personnel Point of View statement. In 1988, ACPA's premier journal was renamed THE JOURNAL COLLEGE STUDENT DEVELOPMENT (JCSD).

1990s - In 1991, after 40 years, ACPA leaders and members voted to disaffiliate from APGA, which was known as the American Association for Counseling and Development (AACD), and was later renamed the American Counseling Association (ACA). In September 1992, the separation became effective, and ACPA moved into a new office space at the National Center for Higher Education in Washington, D.C. Presidents Leila V. Moore (1991–92), Terry E. Williams (1992–93), Charles C. Schroeder (1986–87), Barbara Anderson (1994–95) and Harold E. Cheatham (1995–96) were all involved in this tremendous undertaking.

Early 2000s - In 2003, Carmen Neuberger retired as executive director. Gregory Roberts, ACPA president from 1999–2000, was selected as the new executive director.

2010 - The ACPA/NASPA Professional Competency Areas document was published by the Joint Task Force on Professional Competencies and Standards.

2011 - After more than two years of work by the Consolidation Steering Team from ACPA and NASPA leaders, a voting process took place in March. Eighty-percent of ACPA members voted affirmed consolidation while eligible NASPA members who voted fell short of the required 2/3 majority. In the July/August 2011 issue of the Journal of Higher Education, ACPA's premier publication, THE JOURNAL OF COLLEGE STUDENT DEVELOPMENT (JCSD) is ranked fourth among 50 Tier One journals in higher education. In a study by Nathaniel Bray and Claire Major, 106 out of 144 respondents reported that they read JCSD, and more than half of them cited JCSD in their work. This report continues JCSD's streak as the highest ranked journal in student affairs.

2012 - ACPA appointed the Credentialing Implementation Team, launched the Institutional Councils Program and published its on-going Global Initiatives.

== ACPA today ==
- A Governing Board and an Assembly
- President Gavin Henning (New England College); Vice President Donna A. Lee (Agnes Scott College); Past President Kent Porterfield (Saint Louis University)
- 5,000 members
- 25 active State/International Divisions
- 20 Commissions
- 6 Standing Committees
- 10 full-time staff members at the International Office
- Annual seminars, conferences, workshops, symposia and study tours
- Webinars and online eLearning courses
- eLeadership and eCommunity newsletters
- Online bookstore

== ACPA Publications ==
- The Journal for College Student Development (JCSD) is the highest ranked indexed student affairs journal in the United States. Published quarterly by ACPA and the Johns Hopkins University Press, JCSD is available online in most American educational libraries. In the July/August 2011 issue of the Journal of Higher Education, JCSD is ranked fourth among 50 Tier One journals in higher education. In a study by Nathaniel Bray and Claire Major, 106 out of 144 respondents reported that they read JCSD, and more than half of them cited JCSD in their work. Complimentary printed copies are mailed to the majority of the membership.
- About Campus is a bimonthly magazine for those who want to thoughtfully examine the issues, policies, and practices that influence the learning experiences of college students. Even though About Campus is sponsored by ACPA, it addresses an audience that goes well beyond student affairs to include all those on campus (administrators, faculty, and staff) who are concerned with student learning.
- Developments is a quarterly online publication of special interest to graduate students, newer student affairs and higher education professionals, staff who work with and supervise graduate students and new professionals, and student affairs graduate program faculty. Articles include scholarly research, essays, case studies, text and media reviews, and other current and relevant topics related to the profession.
- Enough Is Enough: A Student Affairs Perspective on Preparedness and Response to a Campus Shooting presents first-hand accounts and experienced counsel from professionals who have lived through a violent incident, and continue to deal with its aftermath. They cover violence, suicide prevention, and mental health promotion in an integrated way, and offer a comprehensive plan to create a campus-wide system for collecting information about students at-risk for self-harm or violence toward others. Editors: Brian O. Hemphill (Northern Illinois University) and Brandi Hephner LaBanc (Northern Illinois University).
- Multicultural Student Services on Campus constitutes a thorough introduction to the structure, organization, and scope of the services and educational mission for new professionals in multicultural student services (MSS). For senior practitioners it offers insights for re-evaluating their strategies, and inspiration to explore new possibilities. The book discusses the history and philosophy of MSS units; describes their operation; asserts the need for integration and coherence across the multiple facets of their work and how their role is influenced by the character and type of their institutions; and considers the challenges and opportunities ahead. Editor: Dafina Lazarus Stewart (Bowling Green State University).
- Making Good On The Promise gets to the heart of the experience o student affairs professionals with disabilities, to the curricular changes needed in preparation programs for that profession, to the role and appropriate action needed by allies, and to resources that all can use in the education of self and others. Editors: Jeanne L. Higbee (University of Minnesota-Twin Cities) and Alice A. Mitchell (University of Maryland College Park).
- Shifting Paradigms in Student Affairs is addressed to all student affairs professionals whose primary focus is student learning. Faculty members in preparation programs, senior administrators and student development educators in residence halls, student unions or career counseling offices will use the ideas presented in different ways. Nevertheless, the book has a common purpose for all readers which is to assert the educational functions of student affairs and services, and to situate student development education solidly within the mission of colleges and universities in the United States. Editor: Jane Fried (Central Connecticut State University).
- Empowering Women in Higher Education and Student Affairs addresses the experiences and position of women students, from application to college through graduate school, and the barriers they encounter; the continuing inequalities in the rates of promotion and progression of women and other marginalized groups to positions of authority, and the gap in earnings between men and women; and pays particular attention to how race and other social markers impact such disparities, contextualizing them across all institutional types. Editors: Penny A. Pasque (University of Oklahoma), Shelley Errington Nicholson.
- The First Generation Student Experience are 14 first-person narratives – by first-generation students spanning freshman to graduate years – that help the reader get to grips with the variety of ethnic and economic categories to which they belong. The book concludes by defining 14 key issues that institutions need to address, and offers a course of action for addressing them. By Jeff Davis.
- College Student Death: Guidance for a Caring Campus is the result of many years of collaboration with more than thirty contributors. This book applies the knowledge of university personnel called upon to respond to student death on and off campus and to provide solace to family and the campus community. It also provides support to university staff in the immediacy of student death, guides the design of policy before a crisis occurs, and provide instructional considerations for faculty. Editors: Rosa Cintrón (University of Central Florida), Erin Taylor Weathers, Katherine Garlough (Oklahoma City Community College).
- Where You Work Matters offers current and future administrators a greater appreciation for the vibrancy and complexity of the student affairs profession. This volume challenges the widely held assumption that the professional practice of student affairs administration transcends the influence of organizational culture. Based on data and commentaries from more than 1,100 practitioners, this book describes how the experience of student affairs administrators varies by institutional type. The findings paint a multifaceted and integrated portrait of the profession. Author: Joan B. Hirt (Virginia Polytechnic Institute & State University).
- Job One: Experiences of New Professionals in Student Affairs focuses on nine narratives written by new professionals about their introduction and transitions into student affairs. It also includes four chapters co-written by senior student affairs professionals and preparation program faculty who synthesize, integrate, and theoretically interpret the new professionals' narratives. Recommendations included in the final chapter focus on re-conceptualizing graduate preparation programs and professional development events. Edited by Peter Magolda (Miami University-Oxford) and Jill Carnaghi (Washington University in St. Louis).
- Toward A Sustainable Future: The Role of Student Affairs in Creating Healthy Environments, Social Justice and Strong Economies is a call to action for college student educators, articulating the crucial role we play in the international sustainability movement. It contains valuable information about educating self, educating students, and making institutional change as well as a listing of resources on the triple bottom line. This monograph provides compelling arguments for taking action on campus and the necessary tools to do so successfully. By ACPA Taskforce on Sustainability; Co-chairs Boyd Yarbrough (Furman University, South Carolina) and Kathleen Gardner (Southern Illinois University Edwardsville).
- Assessment, Skills and Knowledge (ASK) Standards: Content Standards for Student Affairs Practitioners and Scholars monograph is endorsed by national accrediting bodies, associations, and assessment experts. The ASK Standards articulate the areas of assessment skills and knowledge (ASK) needed by student affairs professionals in all functional areas as well as by others. By ACPA Commission for Assessment and Student Development; 2006 Chair Alice Mitchell, (University of Maryland, College Park).
