= Chaney's =

Defunct department store chain in Greater Los Angeles

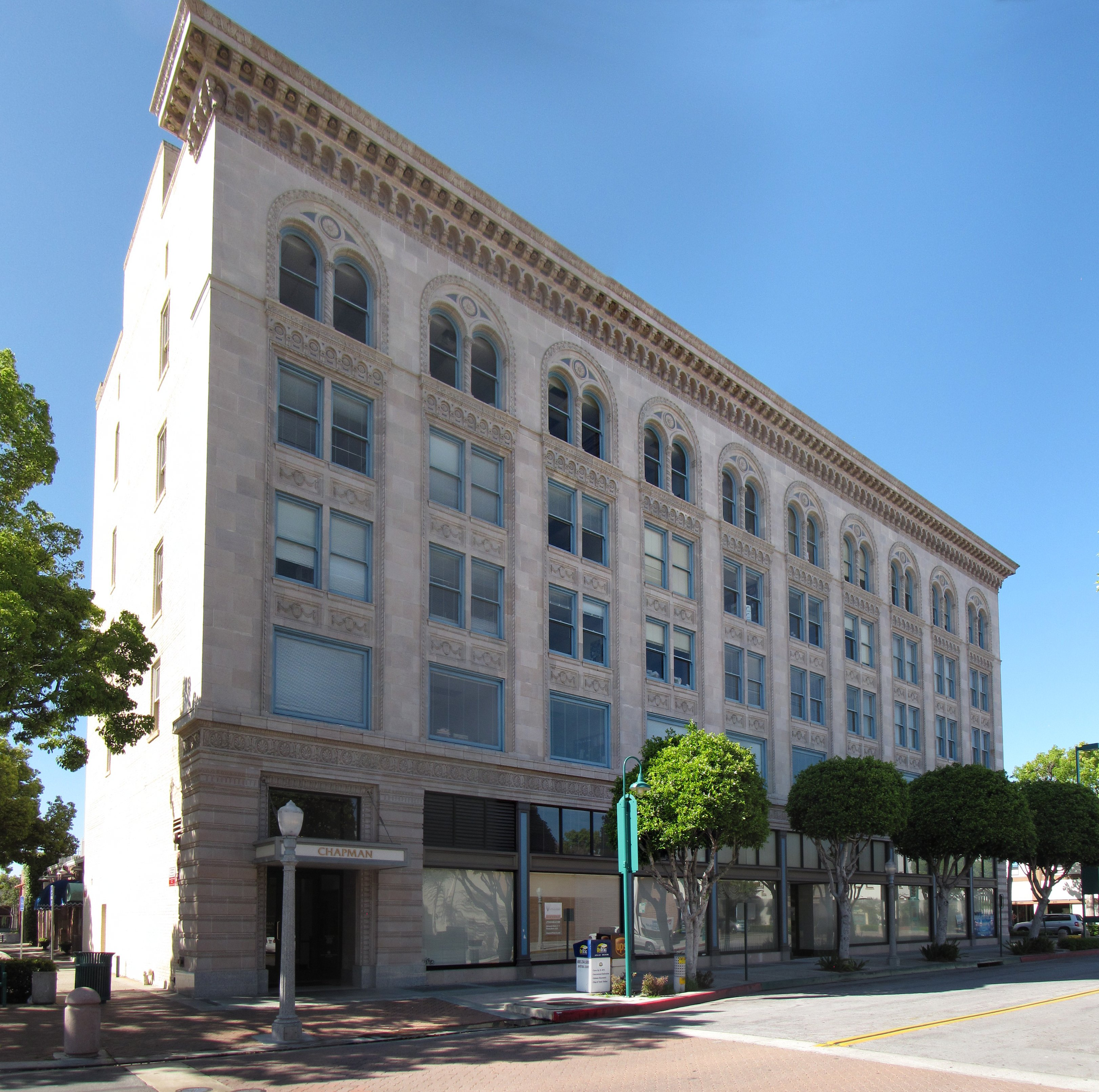
Chapman Building at 110 E. Wilshire at Spadra (Now Harbor), where Chaney's had a location for during the 1950s–1960s

Chaney's was a chain of department stores in Southern California. Harold Oaks Chaney (b. Ohio) opened a dry goods store in Lennox, California, in 1924, then his first department store in Hawthorne, California, southwest of Los Angeles. Chaney opened additional stores in the Los Angeles suburbs.

By 1961, Chaney had sold his stores, and only two stores with the Chaney nameplate remained, Inglewood and Hawthorne. Also by this time Chaney had a partner in the business, Ted Revere. Chaney and his family had moved to Siskiyou County in the far north of California and in that year Chaney took over management of Weed Mercantile, a local store in the town of Weed. Ted Revere took over management of the two remaining stores, which were renamed "Revere's".

== Timeline of expansion ==
Opened	Closed	City/district	Address	Notes
1926 or 1930	1960s	Hawthorne	317 N. (now 12329 S.) Hawthorne Bl.	Across from the future Hawthorne Plaza mall
1940 (est.)	1949 (est.)	Gardena	920 Gardena Bl.	Opened c. 1940. Store manager Paul Jacobs until 1948, when he transferred to the new Torrance store. Sold c. 1949 and name changed to Gardena Department Store.
1948 (est.)	?	Torrance	1269 Sartori St.	Opened c.1948, store manager Paul Jacobs, taking over the lease of a J. C. Penney store there which had opened in 1929
1948	1949	Newhall	Spruce Street	Acquired from Horton Department Store in 1948. Store manager Elwood McCain (1949). Only a year later in 1949, sold and store became a branch of Los Angeles-based Hubbard's Dry Goods
1950s?	1960s?	Fullerton	Wilshire at Spadra (Chapman Building)	Former Famous Department Store branch
≤1957	≥1958	Sunland	8316–8330 Foothill Bl.	Advertised from 1957–8. Was previously Alexander's (1963). After Cheney's closed, was an Empire Silk Store then home to both Ken's Stationers (1958–≥1965) and a Sears Appliance and Catalog store (March 1964–≥1971). California Surplus Mart in 1980s.
1957	?	Inglewood	Crenshaw & Imperial	At Crenshaw-Imperial Shopping Center. Opened 1957, store manager Jim Fruchey

== Map of stores ==
Chaney's locations

== Harold Chaney ==
Harold Oaks Chaney
- Born: May 19, 1903 (age 122); Canby, Iowa
- Died: July 8, 1985 (aged 82); Mount Shasta, California
- Occupation(s): Retail store founder and owner
- Years active: 50+
- Organization(s): Chaney's, Weed Mercantile
- Known for: Owner of Chaney's department stores in Greater Los Angeles and later, Weed Mercantile in Weed, Siskiyou County, California

Harold Oaks Chaney (1903–1985) rose to prominence in the local business community in Hawthorne. He was head of the local Kiwanis International in 1942, then in 1950 lieutenant governor of its new 19th division. He helped built the Hawthorne Community Hospital, led community chest drives throughout the Centinela Valley and Greater Los Angeles, and volunteered for the Boy Scouts of America. In 1961, the Hawthorne Chamber of Commerce named Chaney Citizen of the Year.
