= Thomas Cheney (folklorist) =

American Mormon folklorist

- Born: 1901; Victor, Idaho, US
- Died: 1993 (aged 92)

Academic background
- Education: B.A., English, Utah Agricultural College; M.A., Mormon folk songs, University of Idaho, 1936

Academic work
- Discipline: Mormon folklore
- Institutions: Brigham Young University

Thomas Edward Cheney (1901–1993) was an American folklorist who made contributions to the field of Mormon folklore. As one of the first Mormon folklorists, he collected folk songs in Utah and Idaho and authored books and articles on Utah, Idaho, and Mormon folklore. He served as president of the Folklore Society of Utah from 1963 to 1964. Cheney also compiled songs for the American Folklore Society, which were published in 1968. Along with books on Mormon Folklore, Cheney wrote a book about J. Golden Kimball, which was considered controversial. He was also a professor of English at Brigham Young University (BYU) and taught courses in English Romantic literature, ballads, and Mormon folklore.

== Early life ==
Thomas E. Cheney was born in 1901 in Victor, Idaho. After graduating from high school, he attended summer school at Ricks College, now known as Brigham Young University-Idaho. Immediately afterward, he began teaching at an elementary school. He earned his bachelor's degree in English at Utah Agricultural College (now Utah State University). Cheney served a mission for the Church of Jesus Christ of Latter-day Saints (LDS church) in Southern California from 1924 to 1926.

== Career ==
=== Teaching career ===
Cheney resumed his teaching career after he returned from his mission and became a school principal. He was introduced to folklore during his master's program at the University of Idaho in 1930. He completed his master's thesis on Mormon folk songs, attaining his master's degree in 1936. Cheney then became a professor of English at BYU, where he taught English Romantic literature and English, Scottish, and American ballads. He also taught graduate seminars in Mormon folklore. Additionally, Cheney led students through projects collecting their own folklore material in his Introduction to Folklore course.

=== Folklore scholar ===
Cheney was one of the first Mormon folklore scholars. A pioneer folklore scholar of Idaho and Utah, he collected and transcribed Utah and Intermountain Western folk songs. He served as a folklorist consultant for the 1965 album The Mormon Pioneers, which included 17 folk songs that he helped contribute.

== Memberships and affiliations ==
Cheney was a member of the Folklore Society of Utah, which he served as vice-president in 1958 and 1967. He was president of the Folklore Society of Utah from 1963 to 1964. During his presidency, he supervised the publication of five newsletters and organized a meeting in St. George, Utah in December 1964, where a compilation of articles related to Utah folklore was planned. The compilation, titled Lore of Faith and Folly, was edited by Cheney and published in 1971.

== Publications ==
While teaching at BYU, Cheney continued to collect folk songs, eventually compiling 250 folk songs for the American Folklore Society. These folk songs were published in Mormon Songs from the Rocky Mountains (originally titled Songs of the Wasatch and Tetons) in 1968. This book helped create a strong foundation of research for Mormon folklore.

Cheney's subsequent book, The Golden Legacy: A Folk History of J. Golden Kimball, published in 1973, was controversial at BYU. This book revolved around the life of J. Golden Kimball, an LDS Church leader and member of the First Council of the Seventy, and contained a chapter with explicit language (which Kimball was known for using). After 50 copies were sold from a print run of 6,000, the Brigham Young University Press withdrew the book at the request of the LDS Church. Peregrine Smith published the censored book in 1974.

Cheney's final book, Voices from the Bottom of the Bowl: A Folk History of Teton Valley Idaho, 1823–1952, was published in 1991.

== Death ==
Cheney died in 1993 at the age of 92.

== Selected bibliography ==
Books

- Mormon Songs from the Rocky Mountains (1968) ISBN 9780874801965
- Lore of Faith and Folly (1971) (editor) OCLC 312425281
- The Golden Legacy: A Folk History of J. Golden Kimball (1973) ISBN 9780879050184
- Voices from the Bottom of the Bowl: A Folk History of Teton Valley Idaho, 1823–1952 (1991) OCLC 555590203

Stories

- Red Hair in the Sacred Grove (1971)

Journal articles

- Scandinavian Immigrant Stories (1959)
- Mormon Folk Song and the Fife Collection (1961)
- Facts and Folklore in the Story of John Wilkes Booth (1963)
- Imagination and the Soul's Immensity (1969)
