= Chanay =

Commune in Auvergne-Rhône-Alpes, France

- Commune
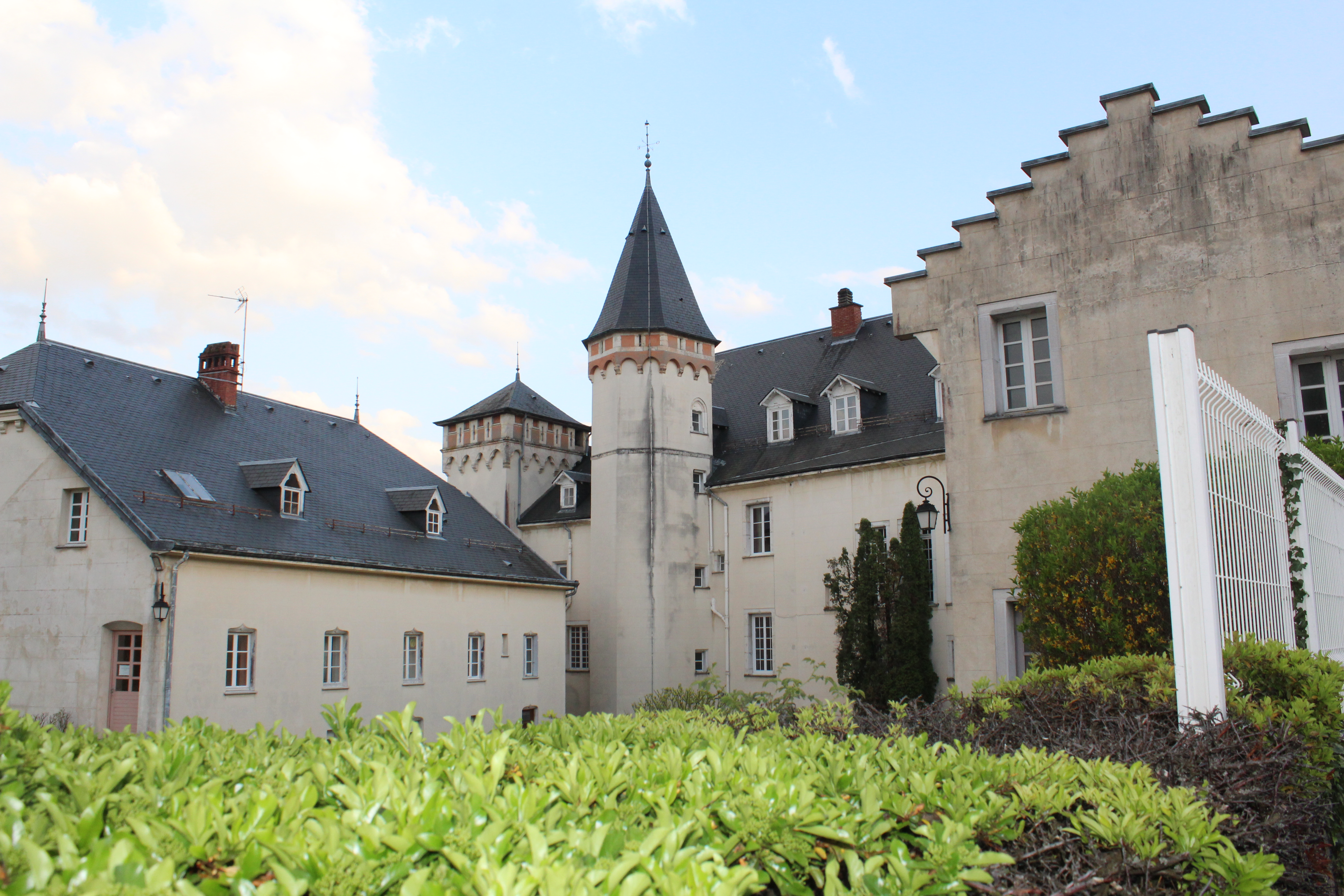
- Château Quinsonnas

- Coat of arms
- Location of Chanay
- Location within France Location within Auvergne-Rhône-Alpes
- Coordinates: 46°00′00″N 5°47′00″E
- Country: France
- Region: Auvergne-Rhône-Alpes
- Department: Ain
- Arrondissement: Nantua
- Canton: Valserhône
- Intercommunality: Terre Valserhône

Government
  - Mayor (2023–2026): Elisabeth Jeambenoit
- Area^{1}: 18.10 km^{2} (6.99 sq mi)
- Elevation: 485 m (1,591 ft)
- Highest elevation: 1,184 m (3,885 ft)
- Lowest elevation: 260 m (850 ft)
- Population (2023): 574
  - Density: 31.7/km^{2} (82.1/sq mi)
- Time zone: UTC+01:00 (CET)
  - Summer (DST): UTC+02:00 (CEST)
- INSEE/Postal code: 01082 /01420
- ^{1} French Land Register data, which excludes lakes, ponds, glaciers > 1 km^{2} (0.386 sq mi or 247 acres) and river estuaries.

Chanay (French pronunciation: [ʃanɛ]) is a commune in the Ain department in eastern France.

== Population ==
Historical population
Year	Pop.	±% p.a.
1968	472	—
1975	464	−0.24%
1982	426	−1.21%
1990	410	−0.48%
1999	573	+3.79%
2007	602	+0.62%
2012	636	+1.10%
2017	625	−0.35%
2023	574	−1.41%
Source: INSEE

== See also ==
- Communes of the Ain department
