= John Chaney =

John Chaney may refer to:

== Government ==
- John Chaney (judge) (born 1953), judge in the Supreme Court of Western Australia
- John Chaney (Ohio politician) (1790–1881), U.S. representative from Ohio
- John C. Chaney (1853–1940), U.S. representative from Indiana

== Others ==
- John Chaney (basketball, born 1932) (1932–2021), American basketball player and head coach
- John Chaney (basketball, born 1920) (1920–2004), American basketball player and assistant coach
- John Griffith Chaney or Jack London (1876–1916), American novelist and journalist

== See also ==
- John Cheney (disambiguation)
- John Cheyne (disambiguation)
