= Theatre Arts Magazine =

American magazine

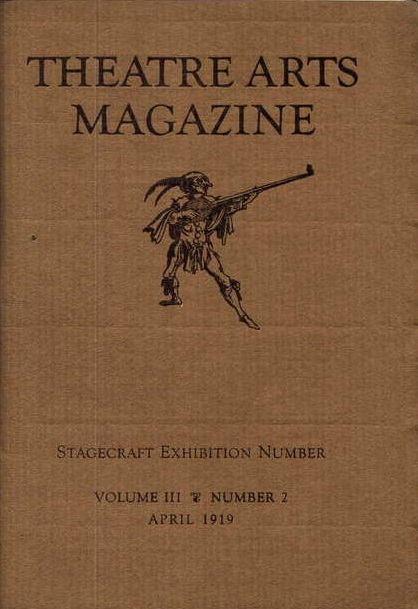
- April 1919 cover
- Editor: Sheldon Warren Cheney; Edith J.R. Isaacs; Rosamond Gilder; Charles MacArthur; Byron Bentley
- Founder: Sheldon Warren Cheney
- Founded: 1916
- Final issue: 1964
- Company: Theatre Arts, Inc.
- Country: United States
- Language: English
- ISSN: 2690-0505

Theatre Arts Magazine, sometimes titled Theatre Arts or Theatre Arts Monthly, was a magazine published from November 1916 to January 1964. It was established by author and critic Sheldon Warren Cheney.

== History ==
Cheney established the magazine as a quarterly publication with the support of the Detroit Society of Arts and Crafts, which provided him with a workspace and financial support. The society's support proved short-lived. When the United States entered World War I, censorship of German art became common. Cheney criticized this practice in the magazine's August 1917 issue, leading the society to drop its support. Cheney responded by moving the magazine to New York City. Cheney served as the magazine's editor until 1921, with several co-editors being added as of volume three.

With Cheney's departure, Edith J.R. Isaacs took over as the lead editor. In 1924, the name of the magazine changed to Theatre Arts Monthly, and its frequency of publication increased to match the new title. In 1939 the name was changed again to Theatre Arts. As an editor, Isaacs included arts such as music and dance in her view of "theatre". She supported the Little Theatre Movement and the establishment of the American National Theater and Academy. She publicized emerging artists, including Martha Graham, Robert Edmond Jones, Jo Mielziner, Donald Oenslager, Eugene O'Neill, and Thornton Wilder.

In 1945 the magazine was purchased by Robert W. Dowling and Henry Steeger. Isaacs retired due to health issues in 1946, and Rosamond Gilder took over as editor. Across three years, Dowling and Steeger lost some $60,000. By the beginning of 1948, they were prepared to close the magazine down, but instead, they sold it to another publication, Stage, which merged with it, keeping the Theatre Arts name. Charles MacArthur became the editor. Byron Bentley took over as editor and publisher in 1962.
