= Cheyne =

Cheyne is both a surname of Scottish origin which means "oak tree", and a given name. Notable people with the name include:

Surname:

- Bob Cheyne
- Rob Cheyne
- John Cheyne (speaker) Speaker of the House of Commons (14th century)
- John Cheyne, Baron Cheyne (c. 1445–1499), English courtier and hostage after the Treaty of Picquigny (1475)
- John Cheyne (physician) (1777–1836), British physician, surgeon and author
- George Cheyne (physician) (1671–1743), physician and medical writer
- Sir Reginald Cheyne, (fl. 13thc.), Lord Chamberlain of Scotland
- Thomas Cheney (Cheyne) (c. 1485–1558), Lord Warden of the Cinque Ports
- Thomas Kelly Cheyne (1841–1915), English divine and Biblical critic
- Sir William Cheyne, 1st Baronet (1852–1932), British surgeon and bacteriologist who pioneered the use of antiseptical surgical methods in the United Kingdom
- John Cheyne (advocate), British lawyer
- Alec Cheyne (1907–1983), Scottish footballer (Aberdeen, Chelsea, Nîmes, Colchester United, Scotland)
- William Cheyne (footballer) (1912–1988), also known as Andy Cheyne, Scottish footballer (Rangers)

Given name:

- Cheyne Coates, Australian dance music and pop singer
- Cheyne (singer), American dance singer

== See also ==
- Cheyne baronets, descended from the surgeon and bacteriologist Sir William Cheyne (1852–1932)
- Cheyne Walk
- Cheyne–Stokes respiration, a medical condition
- Shane (disambiguation)
