= Madison Belmont Building =

Office building in Manhattan, New York

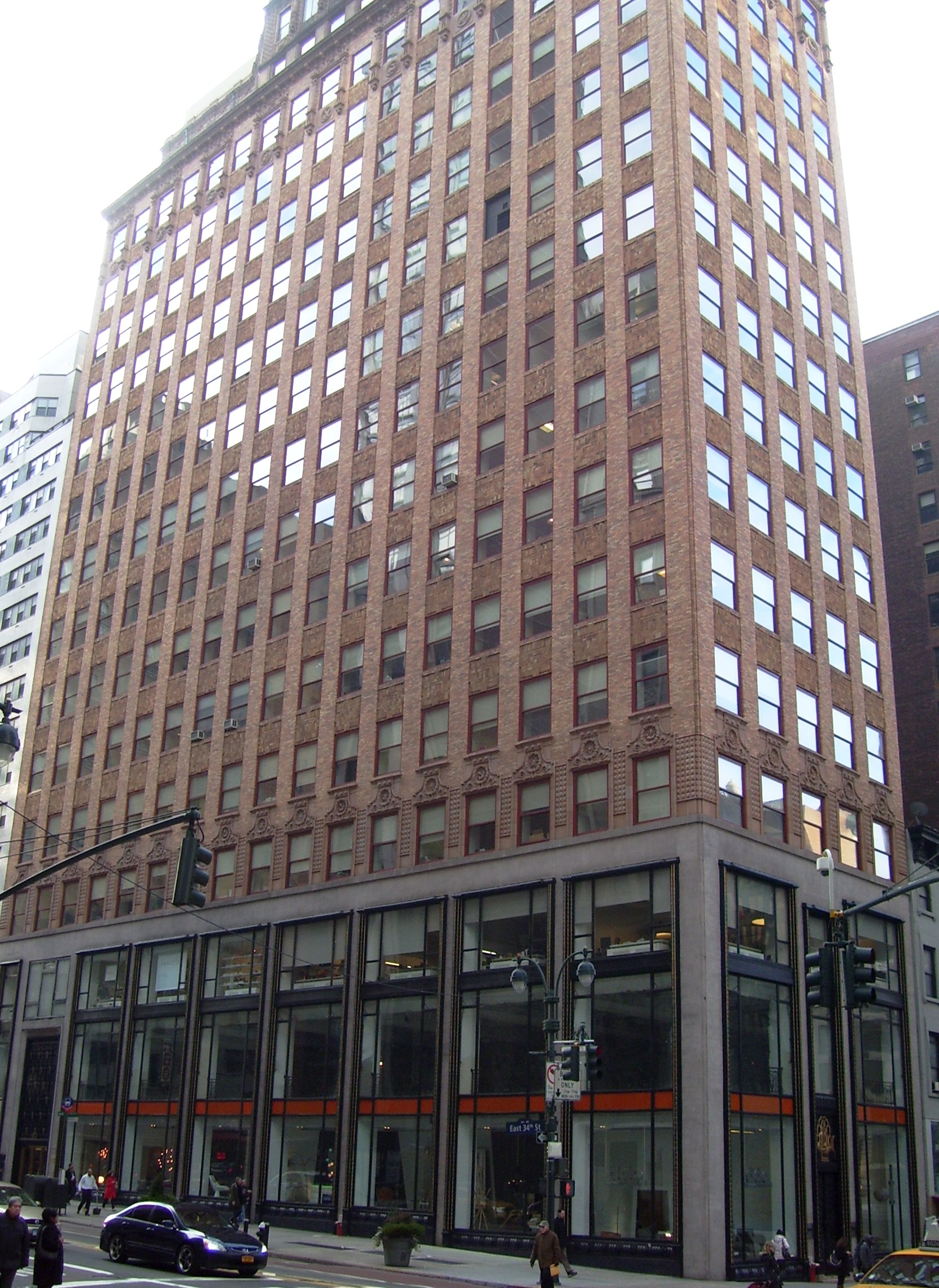
- Interactive map of the Madison Belmont Building area

General information
- Type: Offices
- Architectural style: Neoclassical
- Location: 181–183 Madison Avenue, New York City, US
- Coordinates: 40°44′51″N 73°58′58″W
- Construction started: 1924
- Completed: 1925

Height
- Roof: 228 feet (69 m)

Technical details
- Floor count: 18
- Floor area: 233,484 ft^{2} (21,691.4 m^{2})

Design and construction
- Architect: Warren & Wetmore

New York City Landmark
- Designated: September 20, 2011
- Reference no.: 2425 (exterior); 2426 (lobby interior)

The Madison Belmont Building, also known as 183 Madison Avenue, is a commercial building at the southeast corner of Madison Avenue and 34th Street in Murray Hill, Manhattan, New York. It was designed by Warren & Wetmore in the Neoclassical style and built in 1924–1925. The Madison Belmont Building has a "transitional" design that deviates from Warren & Wetmore's other commissions, combining elements of the Neoclassical style and more modern influences from the Art Deco style.

183 Madison Avenue's articulation consists of three horizontal sections similar to the components of a column, namely a base, shaft, and capital. The base, comprising the lowest three stories of the facade, contains iron-and-bronze showroom frames, grilles, and doors designed by Edgar Brandt. The shaft contains brick piers, between which are recessed bays that contain windows and spandrels. The upper stories contain architectural terracotta ornamentation and a large cornice. The lobby is finished in bronze and marble, and contains a vaulted ceiling.

183 Madison Avenue was constructed as a showroom building for a development company called the Merchants & Manufacturers Exchange of New York. It originally housed showrooms for silk companies in Manhattan's "Silk District". In 2011, the building's exterior and first floor interior were made New York City designated landmarks.

== Site ==
183 Madison Avenue is in Murray Hill, Manhattan, on the southeast corner of Madison Avenue and 34th Street. The building is shaped like an "L", running 49.4 feet (15.1 m) along Madison Avenue to the west and 153.2 feet (46.7 m) 34th Street to the north. A section extends southward toward 33rd Street, where it has a frontage measuring 24.6 feet (7.5 m). Its official address is 181–183 Madison Avenue, though the building carries alternate addresses of 31 East 33rd Street and 44–46 East 34th Street. Nearby structures include the Old Grolier Club and 2 Park Avenue to the south, as well as the Collectors Club of New York and the B. Altman and Company Building to the north.

== Architecture ==
183 Madison Avenue was designed by Warren and Wetmore in the neoclassical style. The doors and metal ornamentation at the base, as well as the metal work in the lobby, were designed by Edgar Brandt, a French iron worker. The building is 228 feet (69 m) tall, and was built with 17 stories. An additional floor was erected on the roof for mechanical equipment and commercial space in 1953. 183 Madison Avenue contains 233,484 square feet (21,691.4 m^{2}) with 30 commercial units.

The design was distinguished from Warren and Wetmore's previous commissions, which had included the Grand Central Terminal and surrounding structures. 183 Madison Avenue's design also included more modern influences in the Art Deco style, which had just started to become popular when the building was completed. In addition to brick and architectural terracotta, the building used 60 short tons (54 long tons; 54 t) of iron. Brandt's lower-floor design was one of the first usages of Art Deco in a building in the United States. In 1925, International Studio magazine characterized the main entrance doors as being "carried to the nth power of perfection".

=== Facade ===
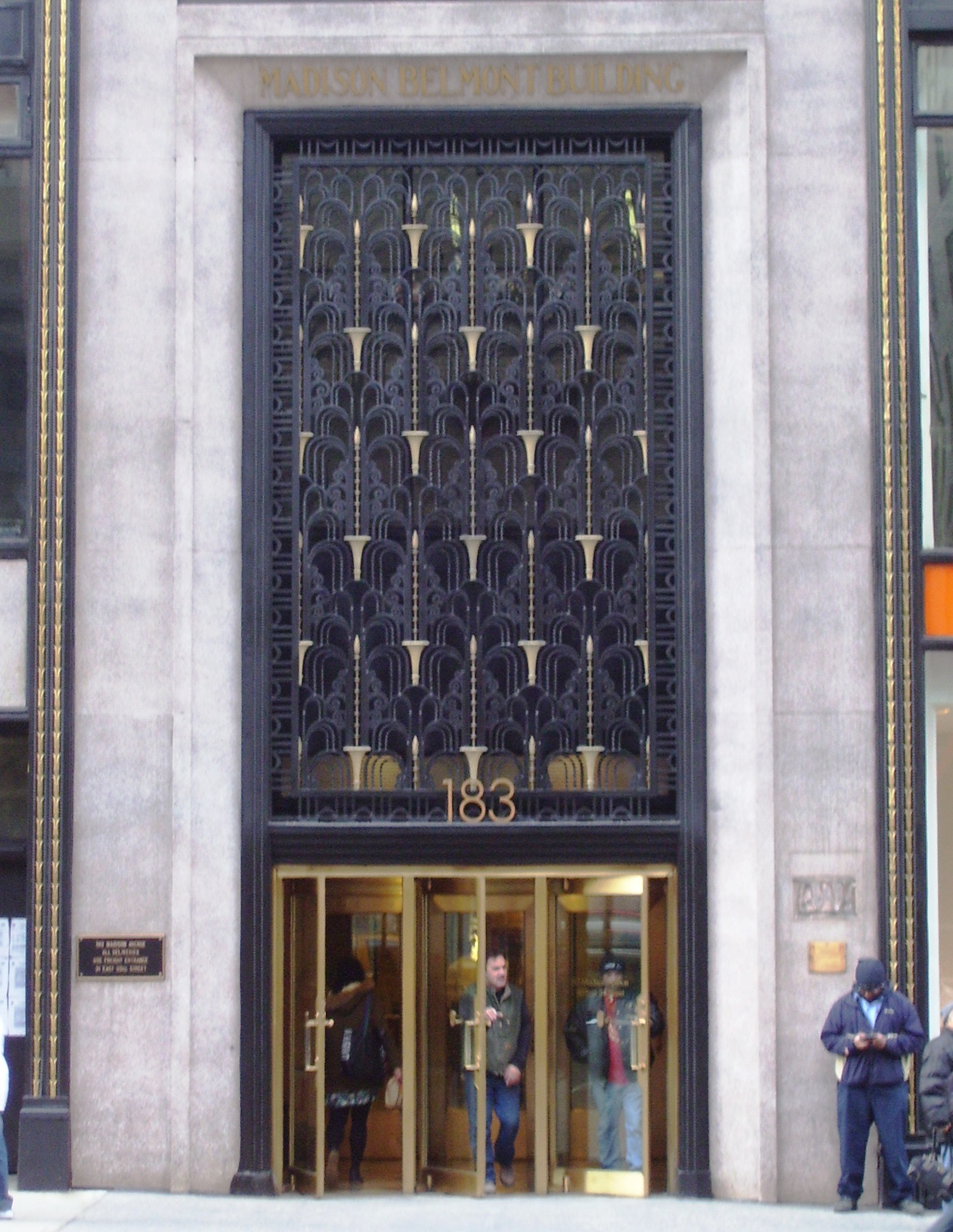
Entrance on 34th Street

The articulation of the facade consists of three horizontal sections similar to the components of a column, namely a base, shaft, and capital. While the facade was made mostly of brick, it also used carved terracotta motifs designed by the New York Architectural Terra-Cotta Company. The terracotta used on the Madison Belmont Building is flatter and simpler in design than on Warren and Wetmore's other structures.

The base is three stories tall. On Madison Avenue and 34th Street, the base is clad almost entirely with large display windows set between granite piers, which are twice as wide as the bays above. The windows are set within gilded bronze frames, and below the first floor windows, there are geometrically patterned iron motifs. The eastern end of the 34th Street facade contains the building's main entrance; there is also a showroom entrance on Madison Avenue and a service entrance at 33rd Street. The Art Deco-inspired entrance doors are decorated with leaves and floral patterns. Above are transoms with black-and-gold motifs resembling frozen fountains. The entrance gates on Madison Avenue and 34th Street have slightly different detailing but have similar floral motifs. On 33rd Street, the first-story opening is a steel service entrance while the second story contains a ventilation grate. The third and fourth stories on 33rd Street contain large windows with red frames, with metal spandrels underneath the windows, and a small cornice above the fourth story.

The shaft, consisting of the fourth through fifteenth stories, includes continuous vertical piers made of brick. The piers subdivide the facade into narrow bays, which contain one recessed window on each floor. The windows are surrounded by red metal frames, and the window openings on each floor are separated by spandrels made of multicolored brick. On 34th Street and Madison Avenue, the fourth floor windows are flanked by terracotta panels and topped by terracotta pediments. On 33rd Street, the windows are not decorated or recessed, and there is a band course above the tenth floor. The 33rd Street side is set back above the eleventh floor.

Above the fifteenth story is a large terracotta cornice and three additional stories set back from all sides. The sixteenth and seventeenth stories contain terracotta ornamentation, and their center sections are set back slightly less than the outer sections. The eighteenth story is set back further and is not decorated.

=== Lobby ===
The main lobby runs southward from the 34th Street entrance, leading to a vestibule that connects to a rectangular lobby. In turn, the lobby connects to the building's elevators and showrooms. Unlike other elevator lobbies in contemporary New York City buildings, the Madison Belmont Building's lobby does not contain any stores or auxiliary spaces; it only has a security desk, a bronze backlit tenant directory, and elevator doors. The lobby is highly ornamented with bronze and marble. Christopher Gray of The New York Times wrote that the lobby "puts other Midtown [Manhattan] lobbies to shame".

The lobby is designed with motifs from ancient Egyptian, Greek, and Roman culture. These depictions include the Greek myth of Leda and the Swan, as well as mythological figures such as Mercury, the Roman god of trade and travel. The walls are clad with multicolored marble set inside bronze frames, which in turn contain Egyptian motifs such as lotus leaves and sphinxes The top of the lobby wall is circled with a metal frieze that contains Greek-vase and arabesque motifs. At the southern end of the lobby are four bronze elevator doors.

The floors are made of terrazzo tiles. Bronze-framed roundels, some of which contain motifs related to silk production and transport, separate the coved ceiling into several sections. Light panels with stencils of mythological beasts run along the edge of the ceiling, and light fixtures also hang from the center of the ceiling. Other objects in the lobby, such as a mailbox and fire alarm box, also contain bronze decorations.

== History ==
Manhattan's Silk District, concentrated around the lower section of Park Avenue South in the 19th century, had moved northward to the intersection of Madison Avenue and 34th Street by the early 1920s. During that time, the upper-class residences that had characterized the adjacent portion of Madison Avenue in the 19th century were being replaced with retail establishments. Three of the plots that form 183 Madison Avenue's site had been held by August Belmont Jr. until 1915. The Madison Belmont Building, along with a 16-story structure on the southwestern corner of Madison Avenue and 34th Street, were to form the core of the relocated Silk District.

=== Construction ===
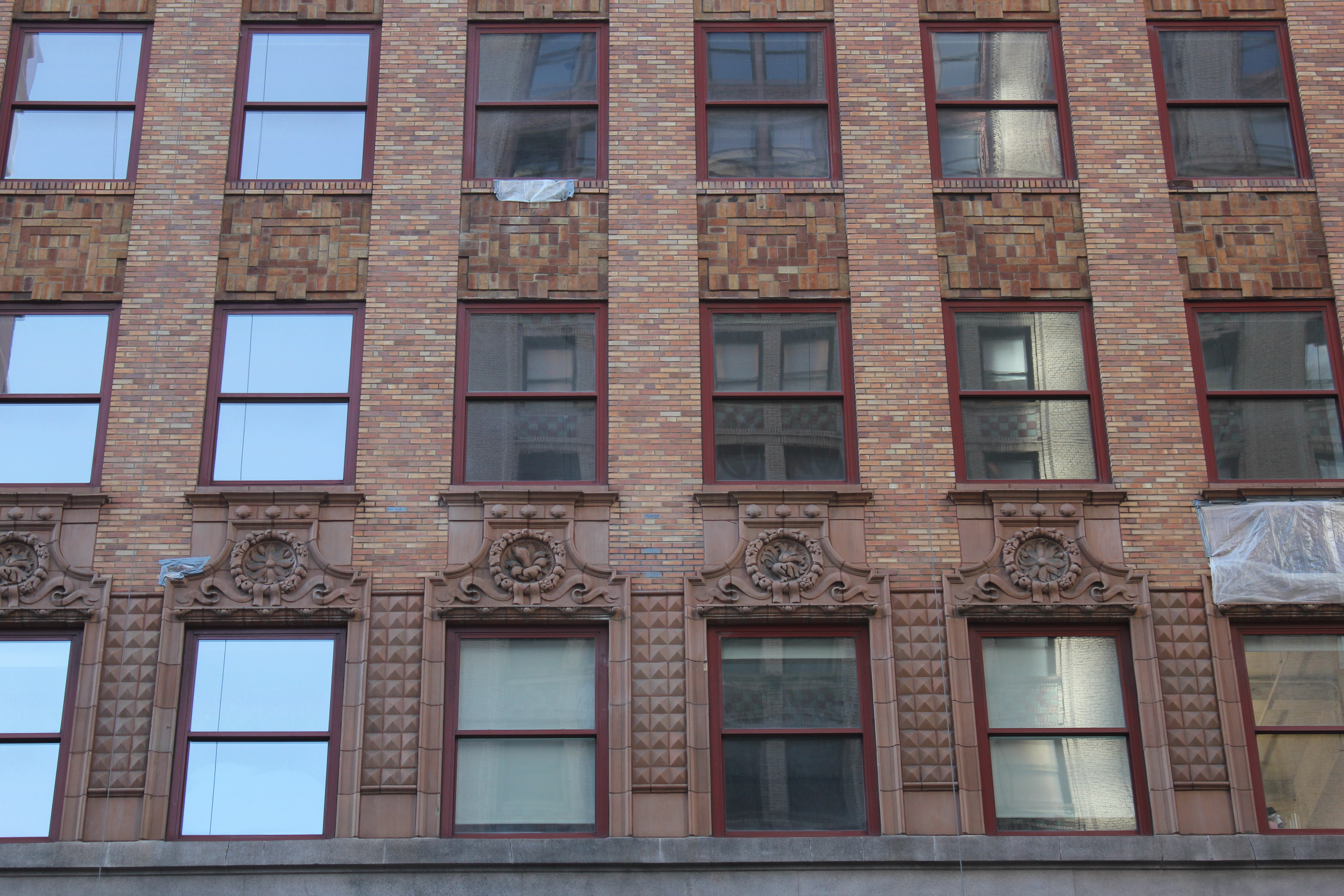
Detail of windows on the upper section of the facade

The Madison Belmont Building was developed by Robert M. Catts, a real estate developer who served as the Merchants and Manufacturers Exchange of New York's president. Catts purchased several plots for the building in February 1924, including a plot on 33rd Street and the southeastern corner plots at Madison Avenue and 34th Street. Concurrently, Catts hired Warren & Wetmore to design a 17-story structure for tenants in the silk industry. William A. White and Sons arranged an $825,000 mortgage for the site in June 1924.

In May 1924, silk manufacturers Cheney Brothers (Note: Cheney Brothers, co-founded by Ward Cheney, is the namesake of the Cheney Brothers Historic District in Manchester, Connecticut.) leased the lowest three stories and basement for 21 years. Cheney Brothers hired Brandt to design the decorative ironwork because Brandt was already affiliated with the company. The company's art director Henry Creange had become acquainted with Brandt through several exhibitions in the early 1920s, and Cheney remade several of Brandt's designs in silk. The Madison Belmont Building opened on October 15, 1925. The ceremony was overseen by architect Harvey Wiley Corbett, while commerce secretary Herbert Hoover, geologist Henry Fairfield Osborn, jeweler Louis Comfort Tiffany, and the French minister of commerce were among those who sent telegrams to celebrate the opening of the Cheney showroom in the building. The Cheney showroom occupied the corner space at 34th Street and Madison Avenue on the first through third floors.

=== Use ===
Catts had gone into bankruptcy by 1927. The Metropolitan Life Insurance Company placed a new first mortgage of $2 million on the Madison Belmont Building in 1930. At the time, the building had a rent roll of $475,000 and was 95% rented. A second mortgage of $150,000 was placed on the building the next year. Cheney Brothers, meanwhile, experienced financial difficulties in the late 1920s and early 1930s because of changes in the economy and silk industry, and in 1935, the business was reorganized. When Cheney reorganized, a federal judge in the United States District Court for the District of Connecticut ruled that Cheney's annual lease of $155,000 at the Madison Belmont Building was too high.

During the mid-20th century, the upper floors were leased to tenants such as the publications Management Corporation, which published Esquire magazine, as well as the Blue Print Company, which had a photostat printing plant in the building. The Madison Belmont Corporation transferred the title for the Madison Belmont Building to the Madison-Thirty-Fourth Street Corporation in 1942 for $40,000. A mechanical floor was added to the building in 1953. 183 Madison Avenue was later owned by British businessman Paul Kemsley, who had lost control of the building by 2010. At the time, its tenants were mainly lingerie companies.

The New York City Landmarks Preservation Commission designated the facade and lobby interior as official New York City landmarks on September 20, 2011. The building was purchased in 2014 by a joint venture composed of Tishman Speyer and The Cogswell-Lee Development Group, at a cost of $185 million. At the time, 95% of space in the building was leased. The building was resold to APF Properties in 2018 for $222.5 million. Early-21st century tenants of 183 Madison Avenue have included a law firm, an audio company, an architectural firm, and an advertising firm, as well as the coworking company WeWork.

== See also ==
- Art Deco architecture of New York City
- List of New York City Designated Landmarks in Manhattan from 14th to 59th Streets
