= John Sherwood Cheney =

American businessman and politician (1827–1910)

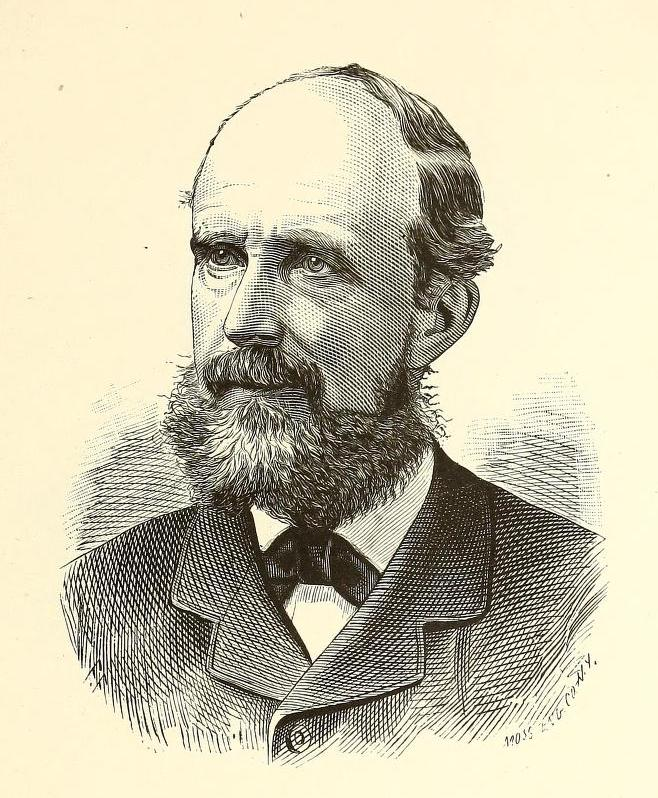
- Cheney in 1882
- Born: April 14, 1827; Manchester, Connecticut, US
- Died: March 12, 1910 (aged 82); Manchester, Connecticut, US
- Education: Manchester Academy
- Occupations: Businessman, politician
- Children: Sherwood Cheney
- Relatives: Ward Cheney (uncle)

John Sherwood Cheney (April 14, 1827 – March 12, 1910) was an American businessman, state legislator, California Gold Rush prospector, and member of the Cheney silk manufacturing dynasty of Manchester, Connecticut.

== Life and career ==
Cheney was born in South Manchester to parents George Wells and Mary (Cheney) Cheney. He attended Manchester Academy and worked on a farm until the age of 18, when he became a commercial traveler based in New York City.

Cheney joined the California Gold Rush in 1848. Unsuccessful as a prospector, he sailed to Australia in 1853 to continue his search for gold. In Australia, he served as mayor, town councilor, and justice of the peace of Creswick, Victoria.

Returning full-time to Connecticut in 1864, he took a job in the finishing department of the Cheney Bros. silk manufacturers under his uncle, Ward Cheney. He rose through the ranks to become a director of the corporation in 1888.

Cheney represented Manchester in the Connecticut House of Representatives in 1877 and the Connecticut State Senate in 1881. He chaired the Senate's Committee on Manufactures and served on the Senate's New Counties and County Seats Committee. A Republican, he also served as a Manchester probate judge (1884–1889), member of the town school board and a school district committee (1873–1906), and captain of Company G, 1st Regiment, Connecticut Army National Guard.

== Personal life ==
Cheney married Ellen Coates, an Englishwoman living in Creswick, Australia, on February 25, 1861. They had seven children, four of whom survived their father: William C. Cheney, General Sherwood A. Cheney, Elizabeth Cheney, and Emily Cheney.

Cheney died at his South Manchester home and was interred in the Cheney family cemetery in Manchester.

Built in 1869, Cheney's family mansion is part of the Cheney Brothers Historic District of Manchester.
