= Horace B. Cheney =

American businessman (1868–1938)

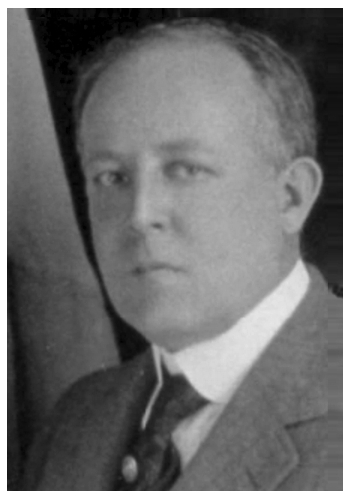
- Horace B. Cheney, 1917
- Born: May 19, 1868; South Manchester, Connecticut
- Died: August 15, 1938 (aged 70)
- Education: Hartford Public High School; Yale College
- Occupation: Businessman

Horace Bushnell Cheney (May 19, 1868 – August 15, 1938) was an American administrator, who was general manager and vice-president of Cheney Brothers Silk Manufacturing Company, in the nowadays called Cheney Brothers Historic District.

In 1934 he was awarded the Henry Laurence Gantt Medal by the ASME for being the sponsor of Henry Gantt's pioneering work at Cheney Brothers Silk work.

== Life and work ==
Born in South Manchester, Connecticut in 1868, Cheney was the son of Frank Woodbridge Cheney and Mary Bushnell, and grandson of Ward Cheney. He was the brother of politician Marjory Cheney. After attending St. Paul's School and Hartford Public High School, he studied at Yale College obtaining his undergraduate degree in 1890.

After graduation, Cheney and his father made a tour de Europe, and on return, he started as a regular apprentice in the Cheney Brothers Silk Manufacturing Company at the broad goods department. In the next decennia he worked his way up from manager of the department to general manager of mill, and vice-president of Cheney. In 1909, he became director of The Hartford Steam Boiler Inspection and Insurance Company for a short period.

Besides his work at the Cheney Brothers, Cheney participated in various municipal and state affairs. In the state of Connecticut he participated in its first State Tuberculosis Commission, and in the Silk Association of America he chaired the committee on legislation.

After his retirement, he wrote some works about the history of the Cheney family and of the history of Manchester, and widened his interest in the art of woodcarving and painting. In August 1936, he died in Santa Fe Hospital, due to injuries from a car accident.

The mansion One Cheney build for his family in the mid-1890s, the Horace B. Cheney House, is one of the historic buildings of Connecticut.

== Work ==
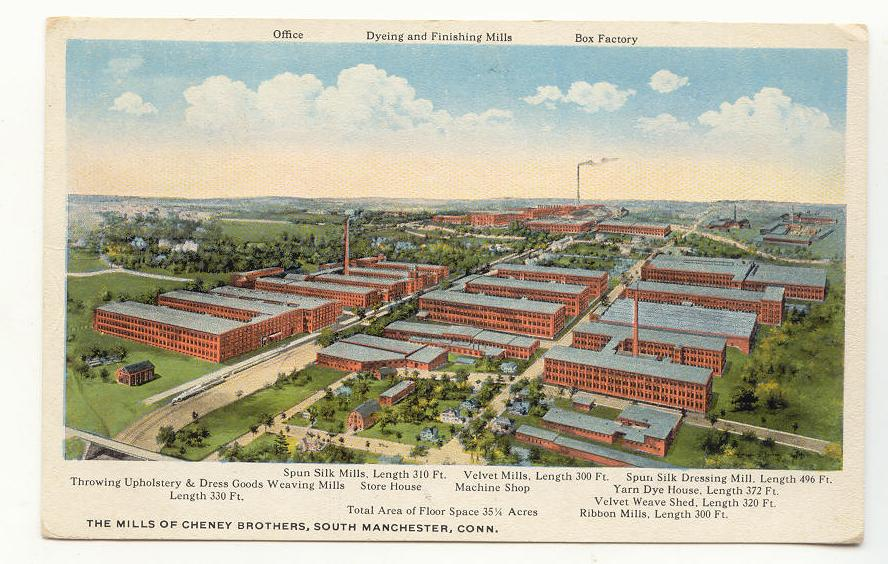
Cheney Brothers Mills in South Manchester, where Cheney became general manager of the mill, 1920

In 1934 Cheney was awarded the Henry Laurence Gantt Medal by the ASME for being the sponsor of Henry Gantt's pioneering work at Cheney. The Mechanical Engineering Magazine, (1937) summarized his contributions as follows:

"Since 1931 Mr. Cheney has been general manager of the mill and vice-president of Cheney Brothers, South Manchester, Conn. He was the executive in charge of the installation at Cheney Brothers of methods of management represented by Mr. Gantt. Through Mr. Cheney's unfailing adherence to the principles laid down by Mr. Gantt, and his success in adapting these principles to changing conditions, the Gantt system achieved a conspicuous success at Cheney Brothers. His personal contributions have been in the field of fair job assignments, studies of interference, and watching time and quality standards."

The cooperation between Cheney and Gantt dated back to the 1910s. Henry L. Gantt's connection with the firm of Cheney Brothers had started in the fall of 1912.

== Selected publications ==
- Horace Bushnell Cheney; Omer La Rue (Special Commission to Investigate Tuberculosis). Report of factory conditions in Connecticut as related to Tubercuflosis. Hartford [Conn.] : Published by the State, 1908.
- Garnet Warren & Horace Bushnell Cheney. The romance of design, Garden City, N.Y., Doubleday, Page & Company, 1926.
- Horace Bushnell Cheney. "An Appreciation of Henry L. Gantt," Industrial Management. Vol. 60, 1920. p. 406
