= Cheney Brothers =

Coordinates: 41.7676°N 72.5288°W

Cheney Brothers was an American company. It is noted for being the largest silk manufacturer in the United United States during the 19th and 20th centuries.

== History ==
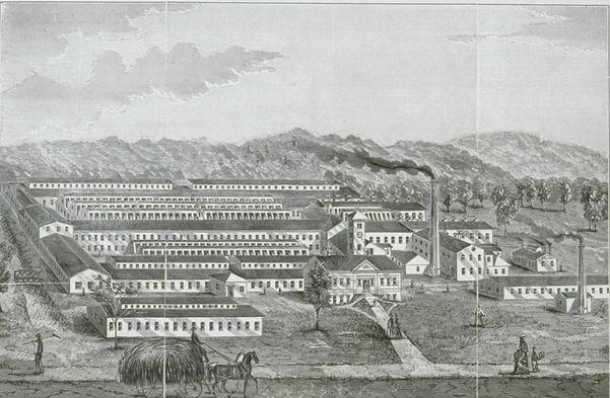
Cheney Brothers' silk mills along Hop Brook, Manchester.

The origin of Cheney Brothers can be traced back to the establishment of Cheney Industry in South Manchester, Connecticut. This was built from a grist mill operated by Timothy Cheney in 1795. When he died, his son George took over the business. It was George's sons, however, who established the company into the modern-day business called Cheney Brothers. The company originally operated in their homestead, which occupied a good part of the South Manchester village.

The company faced a major crisis around 1841 when their nursery and cocoonery business collapsed. Earlier, the company achieved some semblance of success during the 1930s mania for raising a type of mulberry at Burlington that was expected to profitably produce raw silk in America and undercut overseas markets and improve profitability by eliminating importation costs. The boom collapsed due to recurrent blights that destroyed farms across the northeast. The company was only saved by investment made by Ward Cheney and his brothers' Frank and Rush in the Mount Nebo Silk Manufacturing Company. The company focused on the manufacture of silk since then using raw silk imported from China and Japan. Their operation involved taking raw silk from silkworm cocoons and these were turned into suitable material for sewing. The company relied on imported silk since during this period, the American silk was too poorly reeled to be serviceable. It started with the manufacture of sewing silk and extended to ribbons, handkerchiefs, and, later, broad goods or dress goods.

Cheney Brothers silk ribbons and fabrics manufactured in 1908.

One of the noted innovations of the company was a fashion palette created in their mill using the DuPont's proprietary forecasts for silk colors. This tie-up produced silk fabrics that did not only strengthened the position of the company in the then troubled silk fabric market but also allowed the company to become competitive with French design and put modern art and American color in the spotlight. The Cheney Brothers also developed the Rixford Roller, which revolutionized silk manufacturing as it replaced the direct drives previously used in older silk rollers. The innovation allowed the manufacture of hardier, double twisted threads.

Cheney Brothers significantly expanded in the latter part of the 19th century and continued until the early 1920s, becoming the largest silk manufacturer in the United States. It was recorded that one-quarter of the population of Manchester worked in the company's mills. Due to its reputation for innovation, the company attracted a number of machinists and one of these was Christopher Spencer, who helped expand the company's business into the arms industry. The Spencer Gun was developed and patented in 1860 at Cheney's Manchester factory. It is said that the gun impressed President Abraham Lincoln during a demonstration in 1863.

The late 1920s saw the decline of Cheney Brothers. The discovery and use of synthetic fabrics as well as the elimination of protective tariffs contributed to a steady decline. This was further exacerbated by the onset of the Great Depression. The brief uptick in demand during World War II failed to stem the decline.

=== Sale and liquidation ===
On February 26, 1955, it was reported that J.P. Stevens & Company, a synthetic textile company, offered to buy Cheney family's stock amounting to 80 percent for almost $5 million. The company was sold a month later with assurances from J.P. Stevens' executives that little change will take place. After the sale, however, it liquidated most of the mill's property, sold the remainder of the firm to other interests, and dramatically reduced the workforce. Actual buyers were not identified but it was reported J.P. Stevens negotiated with La France Industries, Inc. and Reliance Manufacturing Company. From this point on, the company was simply known for the manufacture of velvet goods.

== See also ==
- Cheney Brothers Historic District
