= Marjory Cheney =

American politician (1880–1967)

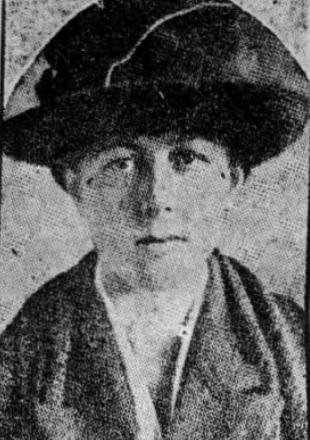

Member of the Connecticut House of Representatives from Manchester
- In office 1925–1933
- Preceded by: Raymond A. Johnson; Robert J. Smith
- Succeeded by: William J. Thornton; Thomas J. Rogers

Personal details
- Born: July 12, 1880 Manchester, Connecticut, U.S.
- Died: November 16, 1967 (aged 87) Manchester, Connecticut, U.S.
- Party: Republican
- Parent(s): Frank Woodbridge and Mary Bushnell Cheney
- Relatives: Horace B. Cheney (brother); Dorothy Goodwin (niece)

Marjory Cheney (July 12, 1880 – November 16, 1967) was an American politician who served in the Connecticut House of Representatives from 1925 to 1933, representing the town of Manchester as a Republican. She was an advocate for child welfare and a member of the Cheney family, who were notable in Connecticut politics and for owning and operating the Cheney Brothers Silk Mill.

== Career ==
=== Early career ===
In 1921, Cheney was appointed to the Commission on Child Welfare by the Connecticut General Assembly. The 1921 Commission overhauled Connecticut's child welfare system and established the Department of Public Welfare, today known as the Connecticut Department of Social Services. All welfare responsibilities that had been designated to the State Board of Charities were transferred to the Department of Public Welfare, and new protections, including licenses for childcare institutions, agencies, and persons, were mandated. In April 1921, Cheney wrote in support of such changes:

In view of the high character of the personnel of the state board of charities, [...] the Child Welfare commission believes that they have been hampered by the weakness of the statutes under which they operate, and to merely enlarge their resources without radically changing their powers will not bring substantial relief to the thousands of children who are losing the only chance they will ever have at childhood.

Cheney was an early member of Connecticut's League of Women Voters, founded in 1921.

=== Connecticut House of Representatives ===
Cheney was first elected to the Connecticut House of Representatives in 1924 and served four terms as one of two representatives from the town of Manchester. She was elected to her first term on a bipartisan slate, and to the latter three as a Republican. Cheney ran for reelection in 1932, but was defeated in the Republican primaries.

Cheney served on the Education Committee for two terms. In 1931, she again served on the Commission of Child Welfare, reprising her service in the 1921 session.

==== Political positions ====
Cheney was a proponent of jury service for women in Connecticut and a supporter of Representative Elizabeth W. Coe's 1925 bill, House Bill 429: An Act Concerning Jury Service for Women, which argued that in light of the passage of the Nineteenth Amendment and women's right to vote, it was also women's duty to serve on juries. The bill was defeated in a 115 to 60 vote in April 1925, and women in Connecticut would not gain the right to jury service until 1937. Cheney would later serve on the first jury in Hartford County to include women.

In 1929, Cheney proposed a bill to end the governor's ability to pocket veto legislation.

Cheney's work in the House of Representatives centered on improving child welfare and regulating child labor. Cheney advocated for the state to fund skilled welfare workers for towns to replace the current system in which town boards of selectmen with no formal training were responsible for placing children under six in foster homes. She spoke in favor of the Child Labor Amendment during her first term in the House.

Cheney supported the acquisition of county-owned children's homes and jails by the state, arguing that "the counties [...] have been struggling under a burden that could be more easily carried by the State as a whole", and that children could be better cared for under the purview of a foster care system managed by the state. While opponents argued that such changes would "destroy" county units and create an expensive state bureau, Cheney expressed support for the abolition of county government in Connecticut altogether, saying: "There is no sense in county lines in a state the size of Connecticut. The counties are unequal in size, in population and in wealth. They do not constitute a natural unit in government and with them we can never have a decent level of performance."

=== Later career ===
Following her service in the House of Representatives, Cheney was vice president of the Connecticut Children's Aid Society, founded by Virginia Thrall Smith in 1892.

== Personal life and family ==
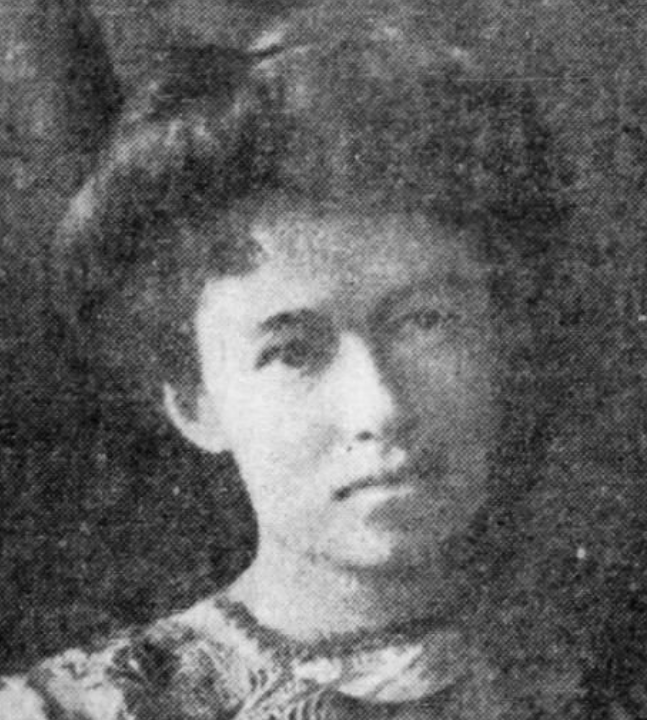
Cheney's twin sister Dorothy

Cheney was born in Manchester, Connecticut, on July 12, 1880. She was one of twelve children born to Frank Woodbridge and Mary Bushnell Cheney, who was the daughter of theologian and Congregational minister Horace Bushnell. The Cheney family was prominent both in Connecticut politics and for their silk manufacturing business, the Cheney Brothers Silk Mill, where Frank worked as treasurer. The mill was the largest silk manufacturer in the United States, reaching record profits of $23 million by 1923, and its staff accounted for 25% of the population of Manchester.

Cheney's siblings included a twin sister, Dorothy; brother Horace B. Cheney, a business administrator; and brother William C. Cheney, a politician who served in the Connecticut General Assembly. Politician and Connecticut Women's Hall of Fame inductee Dorothy Goodwin was Cheney's niece through her sister Ruth Cheney Goodwin.

Cheney studied for two years at Bryn Mawr College in Bryn Mawr, Pennsylvania, and subsequently at the Simmons School of Social Work in Boston, Massachusetts, then known as the Boston School for Social Workers. While living in Boston, she worked at the United South End Settlements.

During World War I, Cheney and her sister Dorothy worked with the American Red Cross at a field hospital in Beauvais, France, that primarily treated American soldiers and employed American workers. Upon returning to Connecticut in 1919, the two lived on the Cheney family homestead, where Marjory remained until her death. As of 2026, the homestead is a historic house museum located in the Cheney Brothers Historic District, and is maintained by the Manchester Historical Society.

== Death ==
Cheney died at the Cheney homestead on November 16, 1967, at age 87. She was buried in the Cheney Cemetery, a dedicated section of East Cemetery in Manchester, Connecticut. More than 200 members of the Cheney family, descendants of George and Electa Woodbridge Cheney, are buried there.

== See also ==
- Cheney Brothers Historic District
- Ward Cheney
