= Sherwood Cheney =

American general (1873–1949)

Sherwood Alfred Cheney
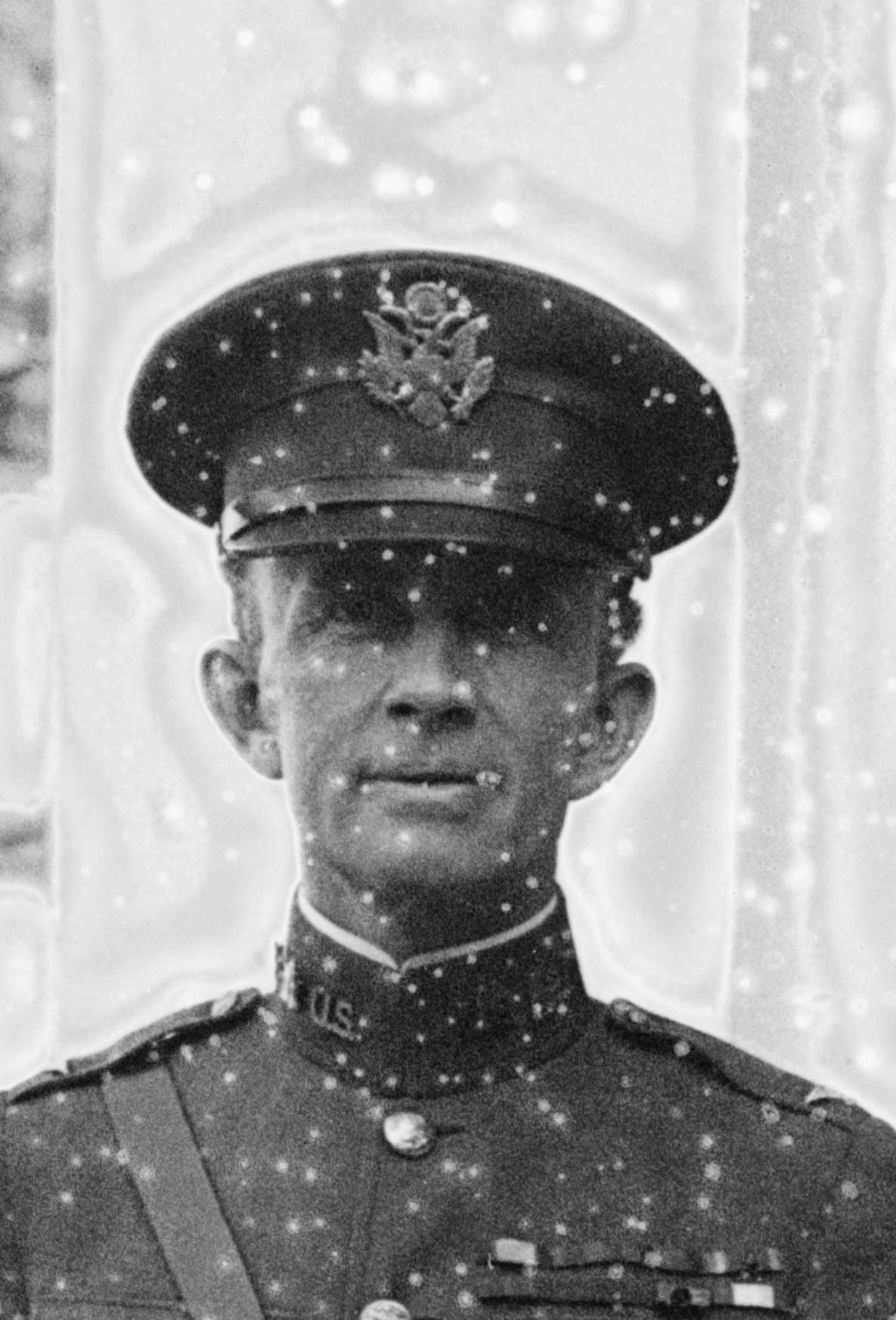
- Cheney in 1925
- Born: August 24, 1873; Manchester, Connecticut, US
- Died: March 13, 1949 (aged 75); Manchester, Connecticut
- Education: US Military Academy
- Relatives: John Sherwood Cheney (father)
- Military career
- Branch: United States Army
- Service years: 1897–1937
- Rank: Brigadier General
- Unit: U.S. Army Corps of Engineers
- Commands: 9th Coast Artillery District; U.S. Army Engineer School; 110th Engineer Regiment
- Conflicts: Spanish–American War; Philippine–American War; World War I
- Awards: Army Distinguished Service Medal, Croix de Guerre, Legion of Honour

Sherwood Alfred Cheney (August 24, 1873 – March 13, 1949) was an American military engineer who served as a brigadier general in the US Army Corps of Engineers during World War I and as an aide to President Calvin Coolidge.

== Early life and education ==
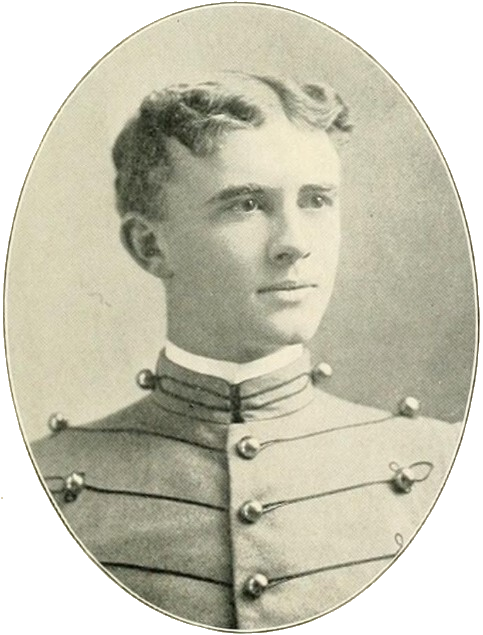
At West Point in 1897

Born to industrialist John Sherwood Cheney and Ellen (Coates) Cheney on August 24, 1873, Sherwood Cheney was a member of the Cheney silk manufacturing dynasty of Manchester, Connecticut, where he was born and raised. He graduated from Hartford Public High School in 1892 and studied for one year at the Sheffield Scientific School before transferring to the US Military Academy at West Point, from which he graduated fifth in the Class of 1897.

== Military career ==
Cheney entered the US Army Corps of Engineers as a second lieutenant and saw combat in Cuba and the Philippines during the Spanish–American War and the Philippine–American War. His cousin, Lieutenant Ward Cheney, was killed in action during the latter conflict. He rose through the ranks, achieving captain in 1904, major in 1911, lieutenant colonel and temporary colonel in 1917, and temporary brigadier general in 1918. He graduated from courses at the United States Army War College in 1907 and in 1921. Reverting to lieutenant colonel after World War I, Cheney was promoted to colonel in July 1920 and brigadier general in April 1933. Having reached the mandatory retirement age of sixty-four, he retired after over forty years of service on August 31, 1937.

During World War I, Cheney commanded the 110th Engineer Regiment at Fort Sill (August 1917 – April 1918) and in France (May–July 1918). He subsequently served at General Headquarters as assistant to the chief engineer of the American Expeditionary Forces from July to November 1918, helping organize the Corps and coordinate its efforts with the other service branches. In 1919, he served as director of the Army Transport Service, "achieving remarkable results in a task of great magnitude involving the expeditious return of many thousands of soldiers from the ports of France to the United States," according to his citation for the US Army Distinguished Service Medal. In addition to this American honor, France awarded him the Croix de Guerre and made him a Commandeur of the Legion of Honour.

Following World War I, Cheney served as military attaché to China and Siam from 1921 to 1924, commanded the Army Engineer School at Fort Humphreys from 1924 to 1925, and served as a chief military aide to President Calvin Coolidge from 1925 to 1928. He then held various district engineering commands around the country until he retired, including service as chief engineer of the Port of Boston and head of the 9th Coast Artillery District in San Francisco.

== Personal life and legacy ==
In 1921, Cheney married Louise Delano (1891–1923), a daughter of Frederic Adrian Delano and cousin of Franklin Delano Roosevelt. The couple had one daughter, Matilda. Following his first wife's death in China in 1923, Cheney married Charlotte S. Hopkins (1885–1978) of Bangor, Maine, in 1925.

Returning to Manchester after retirement, Cheney built a summer home in Mystic and became an enthusiastic sailor. He was one of the founders of Mystic Seaport.

Cheney died at home in Manchester at the age of 75 and is buried in the Cheney family plot of Manchester's East Cemetery.

The Cheney Elementary School in Fairfax County, Virginia, was named in his honor.
