= James B. Olcott =

American farmer

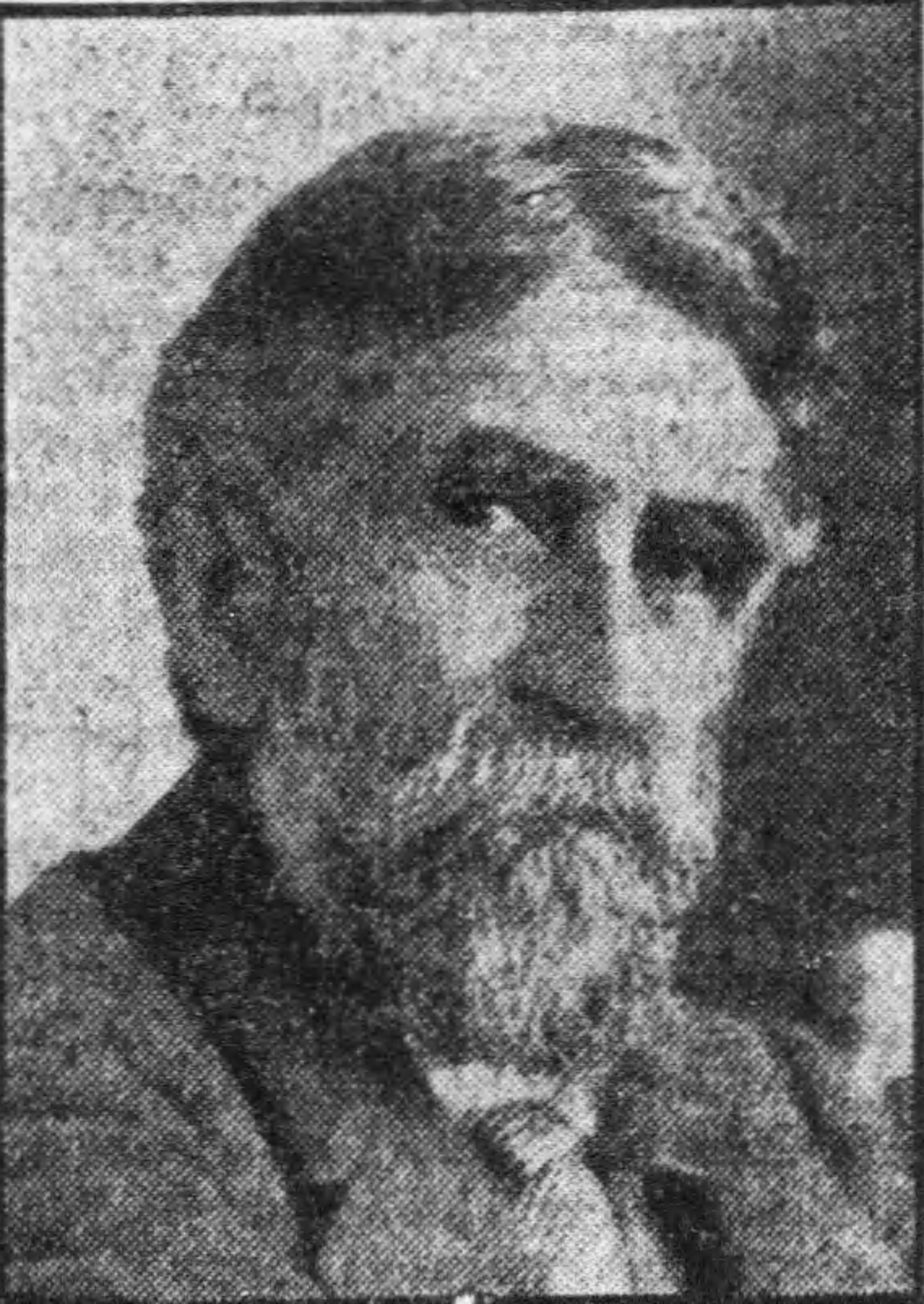
- Born: Luther James Bradford Olcott; May 30, 1830; Manchester, Connecticut, US
- Died: April 23, 1910 (aged 79); Manchester, Connecticut
- Occupations: Agronomist, farmer
- Known for: Turfgrass cultivation
- Board member of: Board of Trustees, University of Connecticut

Luther James Bradford Olcott (May 30, 1830 – April 23, 1910) was an American farmer, specializing in turfgrass, who influenced the development of Manchester, Connecticut, and the University of Connecticut.

== Biography ==
Olcott was born on May 30, 1830, in Manchester, Connecticut, to parents Sidney and Edna (Adams) Olcott. His family had lived in the town since 1711, and his father was a prosperous farmer. James had a younger sister, Cynthia Hooker, who resided in Manchester throughout her life, and an elder brother, Allen, who died young.

At age 16, Olcott worked in the printing offices of The Republican newspaper in Hartford. At age 18, he sailed to California as part of the California Gold Rush in 1849 and became involved in several businesses, working for an import company for exotic Pacific plants and started a tavern and boardinghouse in Sacramento. After a short stay in California, he went on a voyage around the world, visiting Hawaii, Korea, Britain, France, and Germany. Along the way he collected specimens of grass, an interest he inherited from his mother.

At the behest of his mother, Olcott returned to Manchester in the early 1850s. He attended Center Academy in Harwinton, worked at his father's farm, and married Emily Roberts of East Hartford in 1856. He moved to New Haven and then to Rhode Island, where he managed a large estate, before returning again to Manchester to manage his large family farm. By 1869, Olcott was writing an agriculture column for the Hartford Courant.

In addition to tending his farm, Olcott worked for the Cheney Brothers. He oversaw all outdoor work in their vast company town, including landscaping and road construction. He co-founded the Manchester chapter of the Connecticut State Grange in 1885. He retired in 1890 and turned over his farm to his eldest son, Walter. He advised Frederick Law Olmsted on his designs of Central Park and Bushnell Park, especially his lawns.

Olcott died from cardiovascular disease at his South Manchester home on April 23, 1910. He was survived by three of his six children: Walter Hooker, Harry Ensign Olcott, and Annie Ensign Faulkner. Olcott Street, where he grew up, in South Manchester is named after the Olcott family.

== Impact ==
=== Turfgrass cultivation ===
Olcott was "one of the first Americans to devote themselves to the study of turfgrass." Nicknamed "The Grass Man," he embarked on this passion project in 1889 under the auspices of the Connecticut Agricultural Experiment Station and inspired by the horticultural practices of George Sinclair. One acre of Olcott's farm held more than 1,500 distinct specimens of grass, laid out in five-square-foot plots, which Olcott painstakingly mowed and maintained using tools of his own invention. He traveled and collected turf samples from Europe, Australia, and New Zealand as well as from all over the United States. He introduced the zoysiagrass to the US. He experimented to find better ways to transport and transplant turf and, in the last years of his life, believed he had identified which grasses were best suited for Connecticut's climate. His grass gardens drew coverage from the region's newspapers as well as from Charles Piper.

Olcott "was a farmer first, and never saw eye-to-eye with the new class of professional agronomists." Peers deemed him something of a crank, who "was said to have spent multiple days in San Francisco shopping for a hat he considered acceptable." His turfgrass achievements are largely lost to posterity.

=== University of Connecticut ===
In 1880, Olcott served on a three-person committee (along with William Henry Brewer and George A. Bowen) that was convened by the Connecticut General Assembly to review an offer by Charles and Augustus Storrs to donate land and money to establish a state agricultural school in Mansfield. The committee's favorable report to the state legislature led to a vote accepting the gift. Olcott subsequently worked with T. S. Gold and S. W. Johnson to organize the school, and all three men were appointed to the school's first board of trustees in 1881. Olcott served until 1888, when he stepped down after advocating for Yale University to retain its land-grant university status, which ultimately the state legislature transferred to the Storrs Agricultural School in 1893.

The Storrs Agricultural School eventually evolved into the University of Connecticut.
