= Howell Cheney =

Howell Cheney (January 1, 1870, Hartford, Connecticut – August 20, 1957) was a member of the Cheney silk manufacturing dynasty. The Cheneys had long been the first family of Manchester, Connecticut. Their mill buildings, workers residences and family mansions form the Cheney Brothers Historic District.

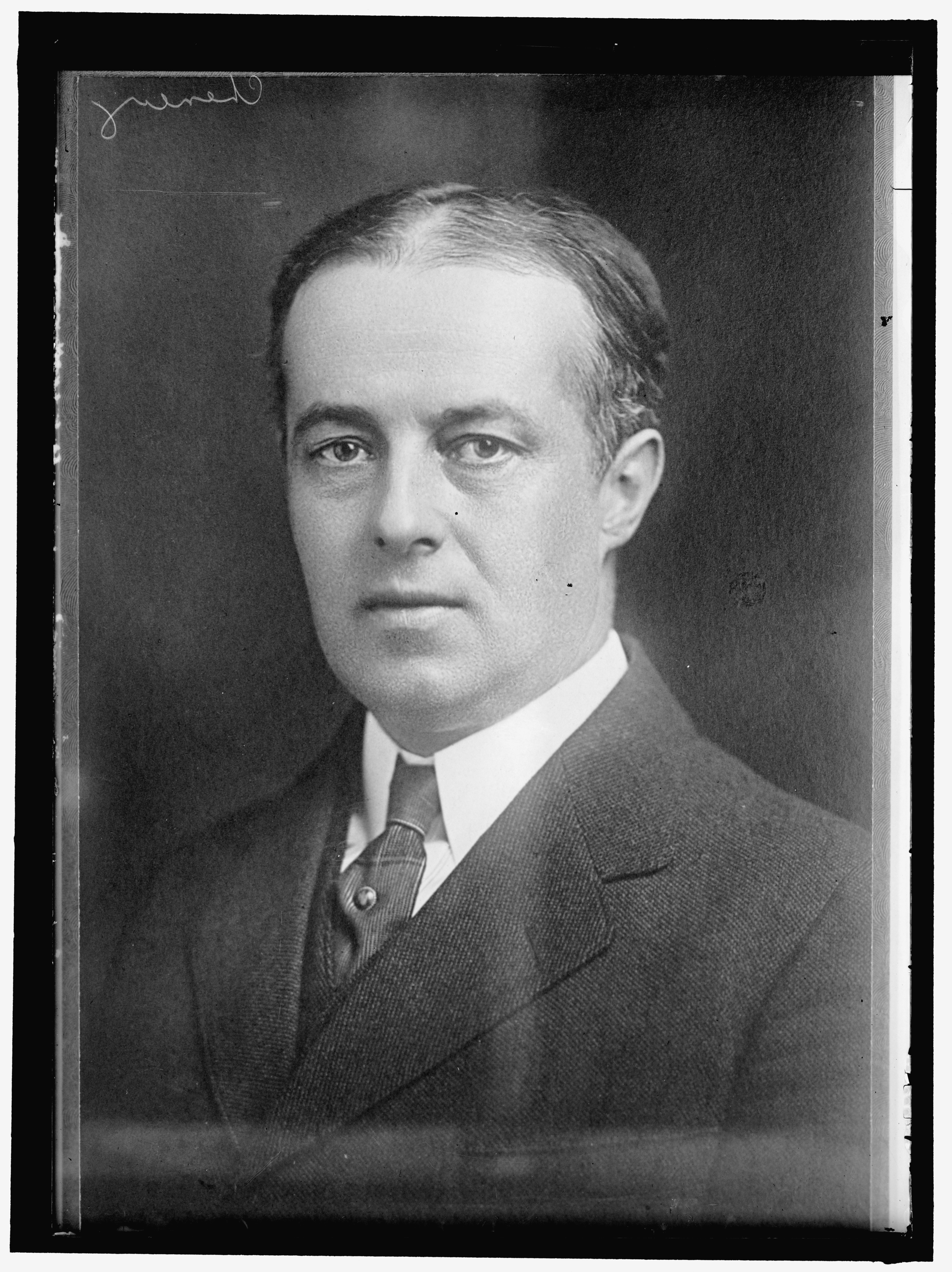

He was graduated from Yale University in 1892 with an AB and again in 1898 with an MA. He was a member of Psi Upsilon and Skull and Bones. In 1893, he entered the family silk manufacturing firm, Cheney Brothers. He would remain with the firm until 1935, serving as its secretary and director from 1925 to 1935. He was a trustee of the Manchester Savings Bank, from 1900 to 1905; director of the National Association of Manufacturers, from 1912 to 1915; director of the National Chamber of Commerce; and President of the Manufactures Association of Hartford County, from 1922 to 1925.

In 1915 he founded Howell Cheney Technical High School in Manchester. The school is now located at 791 West Middle Turnpike and offers ten vocations for high school students to choose from while they also complete a regular high school adademic program.

He was a member of the Connecticut Board of Education, from 1909 to 1919; state director of the National War Savings Committee, from 1918 to 1919; Secretary-Treasurer of the Connecticut Economic Council; and member of the Board of Appeals of the Selective Service System, from 1941 to 1945. Cheney also served as Chairman of the School Committee of South Manchester, from 1898 to 1939; member of the National Child Labour Committee, in 1914; Chairman of the Connecticut Unemployment Committee, from 1913 to 1938; Chairman of the High School Commission of Manchester, from 1927 to 1933; Chairman of the Committee on Junior Education and Employment; member of the Connecticut Committee on Consolidation of State Commissions; and Chairman of the Committee on State Prisons Systems.

Although Cheney was a former member of the National Child Labour Committee, he was attacked by them in 1926, when he suggested that children should be able to leave school and go into industry at the age of fourteen.

Cheney was a Trustee of Mt. Holyoke College, from 1912 to 1926 and 1930 to 1940; Trustee of the American School for the Deaf, in 1913; member of the Yale Corporation, from 1914 to 1938; Trustee of the Milton Academy; and Chairman of the Board of Trustees of Hartford Junior College.

He died in 1957 in Pinellas County, Florida.
