= Howell Cheney Technical High School =

Location
- 791 West Middle Turnpike; Manchester, Connecticut 06040; United States
- Coordinates: 41.7816°N 72.5656°W

Information
- Type: Public
- Established: 1915 (110 years ago)
- CEEB code: 070375
- Principal: David Batch
- Teaching staff: 59.70 (FTE)
- Enrollment: 669 (2023-2024)
- Student to teacher ratio: 11.21
- Color(s): Green and white
- Mascot: Chargers
- Website: cheney.cttech.org

Howell Cheney Technical High School (previously Manchester Trade School), or Cheney Tech, is a technical high school in Manchester, Connecticut. It was established in 1915 by Howell Cheney as a textile school, in order to provide training for those wishing to work at the local silk mills. It receives students from many nearby towns. Cheney Tech is part of the Connecticut Technical Education and Career System.

== History ==
Howell Cheney established a textile school on Hartford Road in 1912 in order to train prospective employees of the local Cheney Silk Mills.

In 1915, the school moved into the nearby Franklin Building. With the extra room gained, several subjects were added to the curriculum, including carpentry and mechanical drafting. The State Department of Education also encompassed the school in this year, causing it to be renamed the South Manchester State Trade School (S.M.S.T.S).

The school changed its name again in 1943 to Howell Cheney Regional Vocational-Technical School, in honor of the founder. In 1946 it introduced a new education system, as well as merging with Manchester High School. The merger was designed to incorporate the entire curriculum between the two schools, allowing their students a wider education. The program lasted only eight years, as Cheney Tech later offered the entire curriculum of both schools.

After World War II, student enrollment increased, bringing the construction of a new school. The West Middle Turnpike campus was opened in 1962, offering a new program of trades such as automotive technology, tool and die making, and industrial electronics. In 1982 the second floor, now known as the academic wing, was added for more classroom space, and an extra wing was added to the shops.

New trades added to curriculum after that were H-VAC, welding, and diesel mechanics. At the beginning of the 1990s, microcomputer software technology and culinary arts were added to the trade program, while 2006 brought the end to the electronics program.

In February 2005, a $45 million expansion/renovation project was begun, to include a new three-story shop wing including a larger expanded art room and three learning labs; the new culinary arts kitchen, bakery, and public restaurant; and new academic classrooms, gym, locker rooms, fitness center administration/guidance/support services, and athletic fields. The new facilities opened in time for the start of the 2007-2008 school year.

The computer-aided drafting and design program will soon be making a cooperative program with Hamilton Sundstrand, a division of the United Technologies Corporation. The program includes potential CWE options for students in drafting technology.

== Technologies ==
In addition to a complete academic program leading to a high school diploma, students attending Cheney Tech receive training in one of the following trades and technologies:

- Automotive technology
- Carpentry
- Culinary arts
- Diesel and heavy duty equipment
- Digital Media
- Heating, ventilation and air conditioning
- Information systems technology
- Mechanical Design and Engineering Technology
- Precision Machining Technology
- Welding and metal fabrication
- Electrical

== See also ==
- List of high schools in Connecticut
