= Seal of Manchester, Connecticut =

- Armiger: Manchester, Connecticut
- Adopted: 1965
- Designer: Edwin R. Hyjek

The seal of the town of Manchester in Connecticut consists of a Mulberry tree with "Town of Manchester Connecticut Seal" engulfing it. There is also the year of incorporation, 1823, fashioned out of a silk thread, all of which is on a yellow background.

It was designed by Edwin R. Hyjek in 1965, and replaced one that had been previously in use since 1823. It was adopted on December 8 of that year.

The town seal is an homage to the silk industry that centered on the Cheney Mills near downtown Manchester.
