= Dr. Dot =

American massage therapist

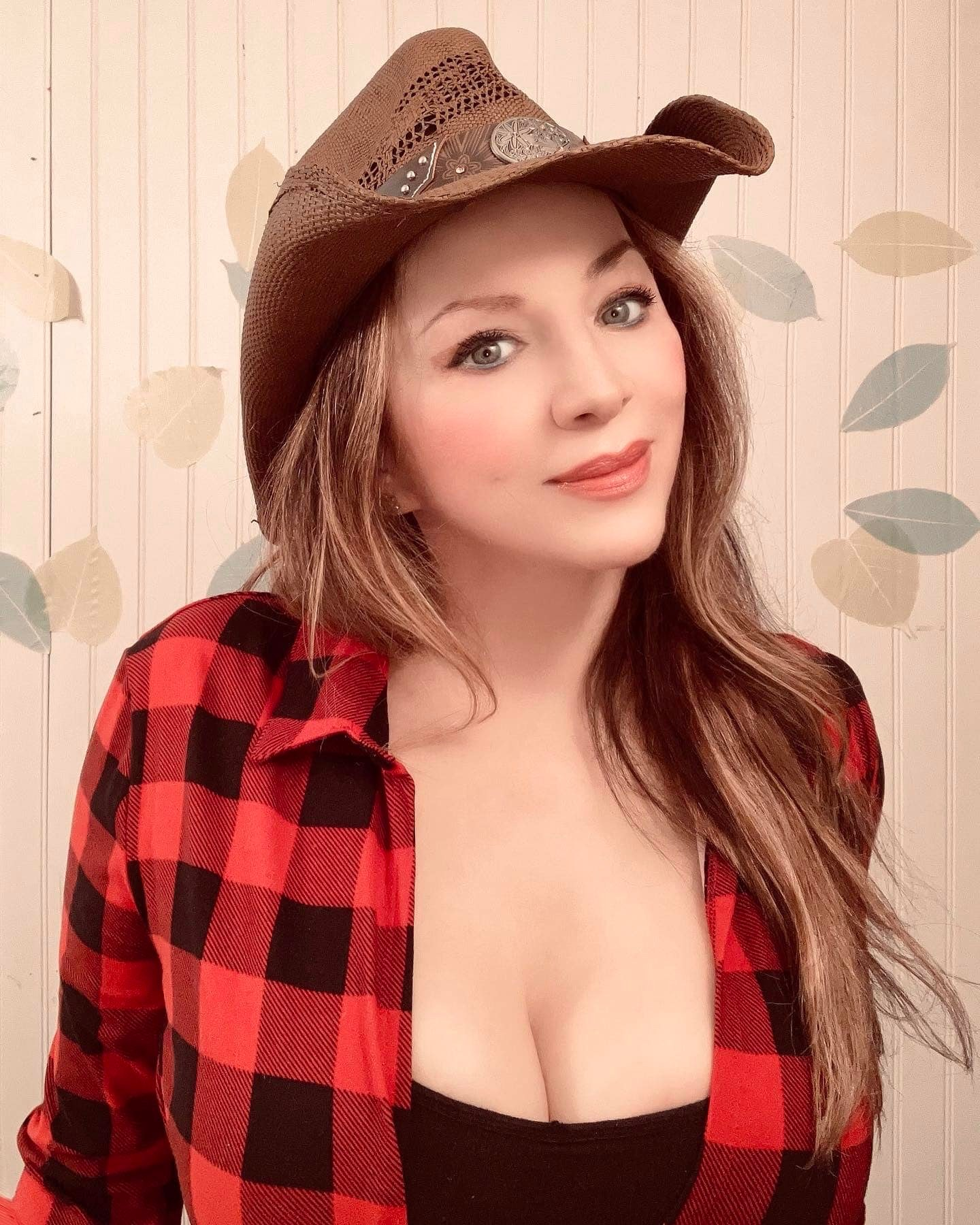
- Dr. Dot at her home in New Jersey, U.S.
- Born: Dorothy Leckner; October 19, 1967 (age 58); Manchester, Connecticut, U.S.
- Other names: Dorothy Stein; Dot Stein
- Education: Rockville High School
- Occupation: Massage therapist
- Years active: 1980s–present
- Children: 2
- Website: drdot.com

Dorothy Stein (née Leckner; born October 19, 1967), better known as Dr. Dot, is an American massage therapist. Dubbed the "rock and roll masseuse" and the "masseuse to the stars," Stein is known for her signature "Bite Massage" and her long list of music industry clientele, including the likes of David Bowie, Simon Cowell, and Katy Perry.

== Early life and career ==
Stein was born and raised in Manchester, Connecticut. She is of Swedish and Italian ancestry. According to Stein, her Swedish ancestors fled Sweden to Blackpool, England then to New England/America." She moved to Newport, Rhode Island at the age of ten. Since her father was in the Navy, Stein moved often and attended fifteen different schools before graduating from Rockville High School in 1985.

She started massaging at the age of five; Stein's mother encouraged her to bite her since she was not strong enough to give a good massage. Her "hippie" parents taught her massage techniques followed by more formal training. Her parents would also take her to concerts from a young age, including several Grateful Dead ones. Following her parents' divorce, Stein started to sneak into concerts, but then began offering her massage services in exchange for concert tickets and backstage passes. At age 15, her first clients were Def Leppard. Stein commented that she "went to every Def Leppard show and massaged them. I built a network with those people and eventually started massaging bands to get into shows." Stein traveled with The Stones on three consecutive tours and went on three tours with the Rolling Stones, where she made $2000 per week. She gained a reputation for "having hands of steel." Stein estimates that she has seen at least 3,000 free concerts.

Frank Zappa gave her the "Dr. Dot" moniker in 1988 in reference to her "expert skills." Stein worked for free until 1994 when Rolling Stones drummer Charlie Watts convinced her she needed to get paid. Subsequently, Stein went to massage school and became certified. She was trained at a medical massage school in Berlin and received some professional training at the San Francisco School of Massage.

Following the birth of her daughter in 1989, Stein moved to Berlin. When Stein first arrived in Berlin, she worked various jobs, including a waitress at an Irish Pub, a cleaning lady, and as a Madonna doppelgänger.

Stein has a rule about not having sex with her clients. Her one exception was with actor Bruce Willis who she had a brief affair with after his split with Demi Moore. Stein noted, "That was the biggest mistake I ever made." According to her, the actor threatened to sue her if she published anything about him in the United States.

Stein took a break from massaging and attended the University of New Hampshire from 1987 to 1988 where she studied French and photography.

== Later career ==
Stein has built a repertoire of celebrity clients over the years. Some of her clients include Katy Perry, Eminem, Courtney Love, Robert Plant, Simon Cowell, David Bowie, Juliette Lewis, Kanye West, and Mariah Carey. To help keep up with the high demand of her services, Stein assembled a team of massage therapists. She named her business Dr. Dot International Massage and Chiropractic Team and the contracted therapists are known as "Dot Bots." Stein employs a staff of over 900 across 30 countries. Stein vets and approves each therapist who must be either certified or licensed and have at least one year of experience. Treatment starts at $160 per hour and increases as it gets later in the evening. Stein and her team of masseurs tailor their massages to address common physiological conditions in musicians, such as tendinitis, trigger finger, and myofascial pain syndrome. Stein also provides a mobile spa service that offers facials, pedicures, and manicures.

Stein released her own brand of massage oil made with argan.

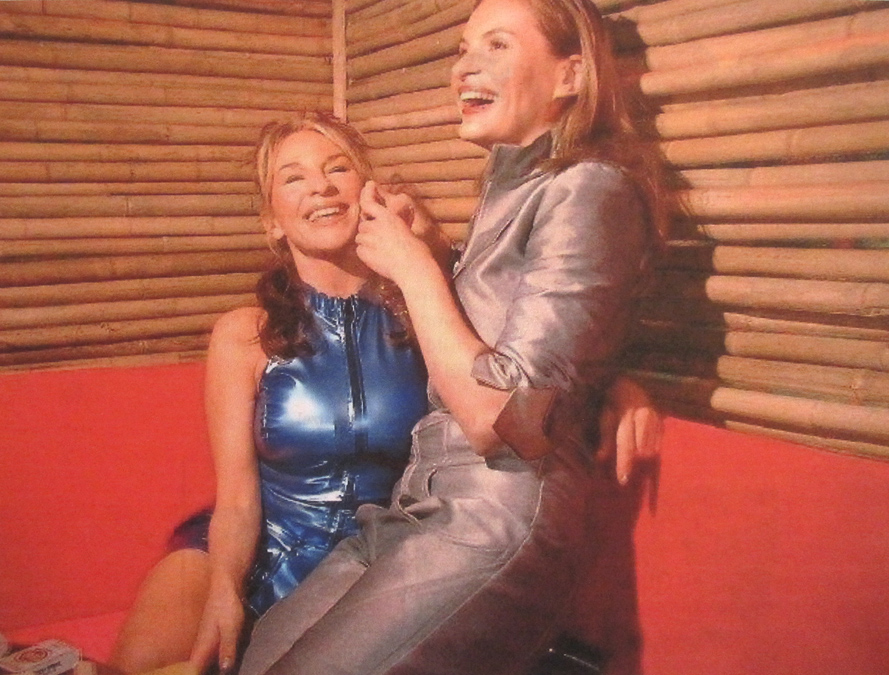
Dr. Dot (left) in Berlin with Ruslana Eisenschmidt.

=== Bite Massage ===
Stein trademarked her Bite Massage in 2017 and videos of Stein's massages have gone viral. Stein admits the Bite Massage is her "most controversial" technique. She claims biting someone's back results in better blood circulation. Without adding any oil, Stein bites the client's entire back in a "very fluent motion section by section" and avoids biting any bones. Stein also bites the client's neck, shoulders, and sometimes the glutes. Her bites are large but not enough to break the skin. According to Stein, the bites go deep enough to "tenderize" the back muscles and prepare them for the traditional massage that follows. Stein only offers the Bite Massage to select clients.

Some medical experts have raised concerns about Stein's Bite Massage. Physician Holly Phillips says that "about 10 to 15 percent of human bite wounds become infected by bacteria. There is also the potential for transmission of viruses like hepatitis B." Joshua Zeichner, an assistant professor of dermatology at Mount Sinai Hospital, stated that human bites can transmit infectious diseases and "does not recommend, under any circumstance, being bit by another person."

During an appearance on This Morning, Stein demonstrated her biting technique on host Eamonn Holmes, first biting his hand then his shoulder.

=== Mikheil Saakashvili ===
In February 2009, Stein flew in to Georgia to treat then-president Mikheil Saakashvili. Stein posted an image of Saakashvili's arm around her on her blog and an account of her trip. Some members of a Georgian opposition group used the photo as a poster campaign against Saakashvili. Russia Today sought to portray Stein's visit as "a sign that Mr. Saakashvili is using his office to live a life of at least mildly kinky luxury, fit for a rock star." Stein responded that "Georgian media and opposition were distorting the contents of her blog by taking things out of context." Opponents of Saakashvili accused him of using public funds to fly Dot to Georgia for a massage. Giga Bokeria, a top advisor to Saakashvili, stated that the government did not spend money on Stein's visit and the president's opponents were "trying to smear his reputation." Saakashvili maintained that he received only a single massage from Stein. However, Stein said she massaged Saakashvili multiple times and received €2,000 in compensation. Stein also said Saakashvili gave her "a bunch of presents" including a gold necklace with a religious pendant. In 2014, the Prosecutor's Office filed embezzlement charges against Saakashvili; one of the expenditures included Stein.

Saakashvili's association with Stein worsened the image of his party, the United National Movement, in the eyes of Georgian voters.

=== Other ventures ===
Stein is also a popular sex advice columnist. Her column, "Ask Dr. Dot," ran in Penthouse and the New York Press and now is published exclusively in the English-language German magazine Exberliner. Stein has also posed in Penthouse.

Stein published a book, "Mein Hautnahes Leben mit Denn Popstars," in Germany in 1999.

Stein was approached by General Motors in 2015 to help create a unique in-car self-massage technique.

== Personal life ==
Stein dated musician Joey Ramone for three years. She was 15 at the time and maintains that Ramone did not know her real age. Stein had a daughter at age 21 with a German man she met at a Grateful Dead concert. Stein stated that they are "still good friends" and that he took care of their daughter when Stein visited Berlin on tours. Stein later married and divorced her second husband, a Turkish national, with whom she had a son. Stein is raising the child on her own. She speaks German.

Stein splits her time between Berlin and Hoboken, New Jersey.
