= Manchester, Connecticut =

- Town
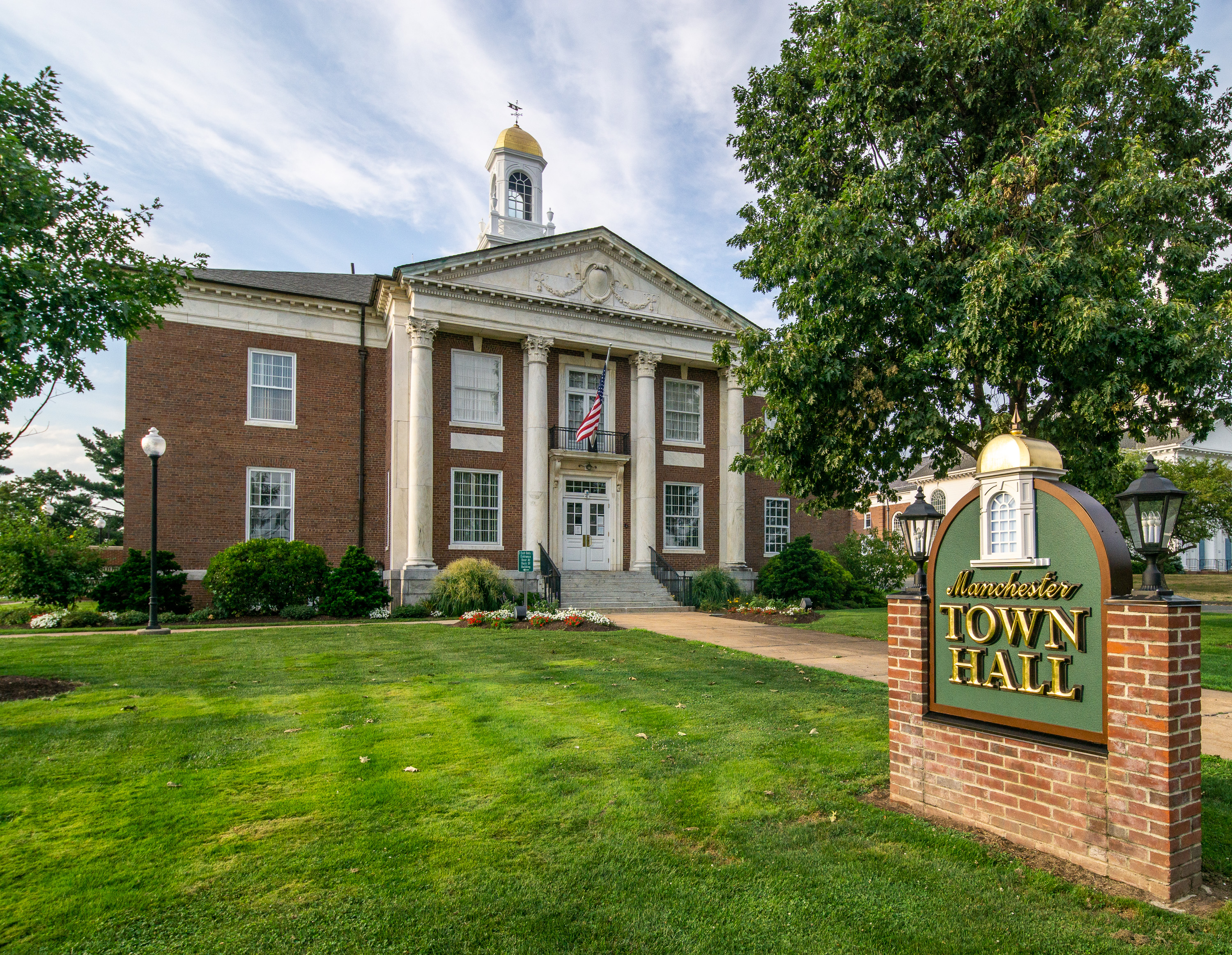
- Town Hall

- Flag Seal
- Nickname: Silk City
- Motto: "City of Village Charm"
- Interactive map of Manchester, Connecticut
- Coordinates: 41°46′31″N 72°31′27″W
- Country: United States
- U.S. state: Connecticut
- County: Hartford
- Region: Capitol Region
- Founded: 1672
- Incorporated: 1823

Government
  - Type: Council–manager
  - Town Manager: Steve Stephanou
  - Board of Directors: Jay Moran (D), Mayor; Sarah Jones (D), Deputy Mayor; Dennis Schain(D), Secretary; Pamela Floyd-Cranford (D); Peter Conyers (R); Leslie Frey (R); Jessee Muniz Poland (D); Ed Boland (R); Jerald Lentini (D);

Area
  - Total: 27.7 sq mi (71.7 km^{2})
  - Land: 27.3 sq mi (70.6 km^{2})
  - Water: 0.42 sq mi (1.1 km^{2})
- Elevation: 272 ft (83 m)

Population (2020)
  - Total: 59,713
  - Density: 2,191/sq mi (845.8/km^{2})
- Time zone: UTC−5 (EST)
  - Summer (DST): UTC−4 (EDT)
- ZIP Codes: 06040–06042, 06045
- Area codes: 860/959
- FIPS code: 09-44700
- GNIS feature ID: 213455
- Website: www.manchesterct.gov

Manchester is a town in Hartford County, Connecticut, United States. The town is part of the Capitol Planning Region. As of the 2020 census, the town had a total population of 59,713. The urban center of the town is the Manchester census-designated place, with a population of 36,379 at the 2020 census. The town is named after Manchester, in England.

== History ==
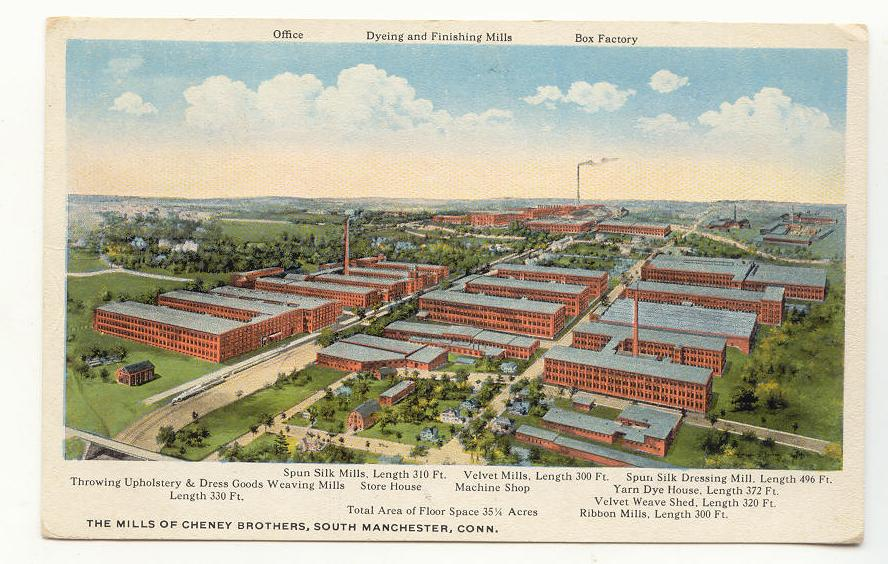
Cheney Brothers Mills in South Manchester, 1920

The area known as Manchester began its recorded history as the camping grounds of a small band of peaceful Native Americans known as the Podunk tribe. The area was settled by colonists around 1673, some 40 years after Thomas Hooker led a group of Puritans from Massachusetts Bay Colony to found Hartford.

At the time, the community was known as Orford Parish, a name that can still be found on the memorial to local Revolutionary War soldiers. The many rivers and brooks provided power for paper, lumber, and textile industries, and the town quickly evolved into an industrial center. The town of Hartford once included the land now occupied by the towns of Manchester, East Hartford, and West Hartford. In 1783, East Hartford became a separate town, which included Manchester in its city limits until 1823.

The Pitkin Glassworks operated from 1783 to 1830 as the first successful glassworks in Connecticut. The owner of the glassworks, Captain Richard Pitkin, was given a 25-year monopoly on glass as recompense for providing gunpowder to the Continental Army during the American Revolution. The Pitkin Glassworks Ruin has been preserved by the town's historical society.

In 1838, the Cheney family started what became the world's largest silk mill. Eventually, the Cheney family employed a quarter of residents and actively recruited immigrants to work in the mills. The manufacturing presence in the town made Manchester an ideal industrial community. The mills, houses of the owners, and homes of the workers are now part of the Cheney Brothers Historic District, a National Historic Landmark.

Also of note are the E.E. Hilliard Company Woolen Mills. Founded c. 1780 by Aaron Buckland and later sold to the Hilliard family, the Hilliard Mills are the oldest woolen mill site in the country.

== Geography ==
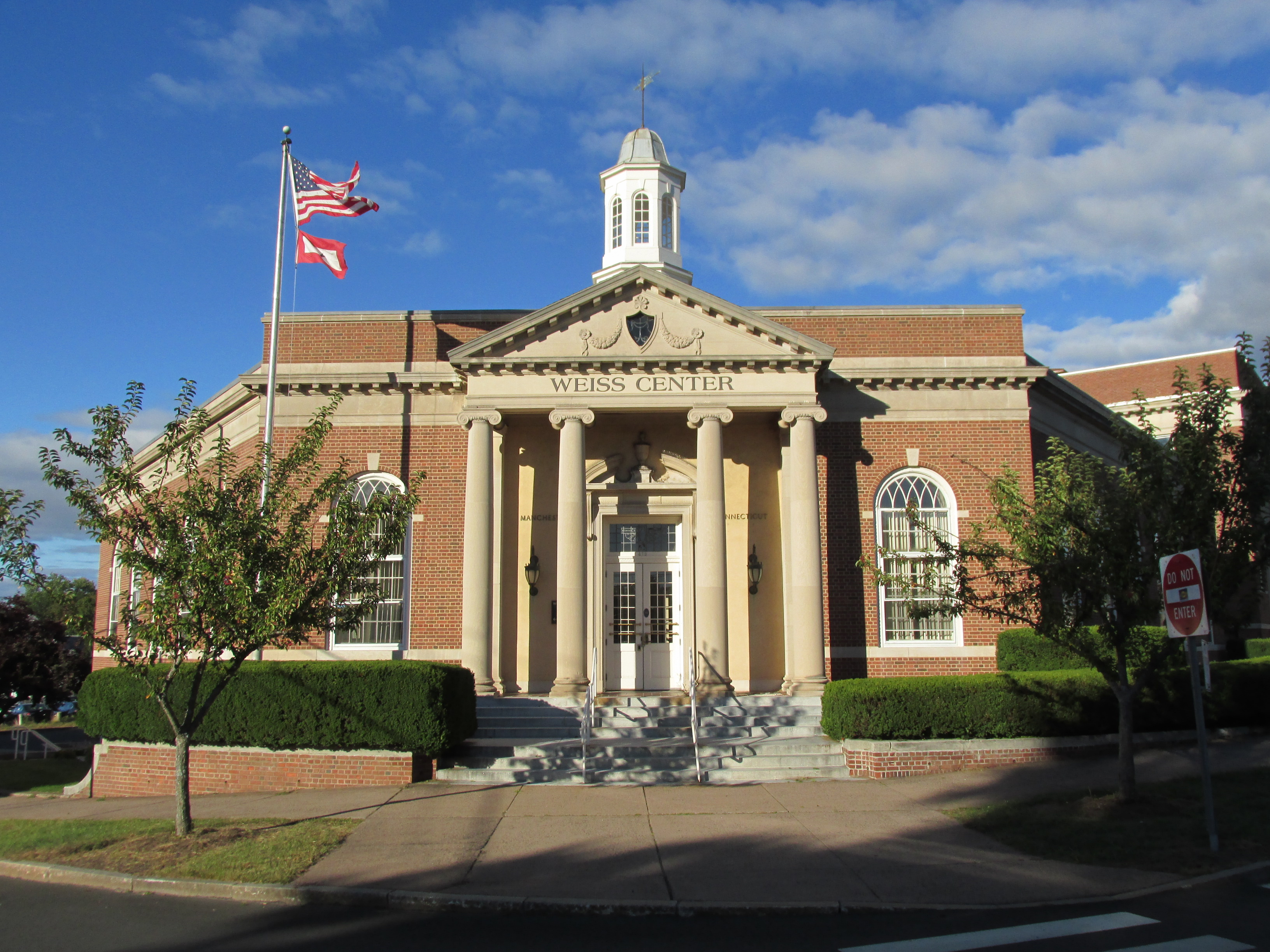
Weiss Center is listed on the National Register of Historic Places.

According to the U.S. Census Bureau, Manchester has a total area of 27.7 square miles (71.7 km^{2}), of which 27.4 square miles (71.0 km^{2}) is land and 0.27 square miles (0.7 km^{2}), or 1.00%, is water. The Manchester census-designated place consists of the urban center of the town and has a total area of 6.5 square miles (16.8 km^{2}), or about 23% of the town's total area. A total of 6.4 square miles (16.7 km^{2}) of Manchester is land, and 0.039 square miles (0.1 km^{2}), or 0.56%, is water.

== Economy ==
=== Top employers ===
Top employers in Manchester according to the town's 2025 Comprehensive Annual Financial Report.

#	Employer	# of Employees
1	Town of Manchester	1,892
2	Manchester Community College	659
3	Amazon	500
4	Allied Printing	430
5	Manchester Memorial Hospital	400
6	Walmart	360
7	Paradigm	350
8	Stop & Shop	350
9	Target	300
10	Marc Inc.	267

As home to the Cheney family silk fortune, Manchester was a center of the American silk industry from the late 19th century to the mid-20th century, and was an integral component of not only the economy but success of the town. Today, the Cheney Brothers Historic District showcases mills refurbished as apartments and includes nearby museums.

Manchester posted a total revenue, as of 2017, of $202,901,000, with total expenditures of $199 million, including $133 million towards education. The median rent between 2013–2017 was $1,181, higher than both the county and state medians. The top employing industries are retail trade, health care and social assistance, manufacturing, and government; and the top employers are the Town of Manchester, the Board of Education, Eastern Connecticut Health Network, Inc., and Allied Printing.

The town is home to The Shoppes at Buckland Hills, as well as Shady Glen, a restaurant recognized by the James Beard Foundation in 2012 as an American classic, and has been featured on Food Network.

== Demographics ==
Manchester, Connecticut – Racial and ethnic composition Note: the US Census treats Hispanic/Latino as an ethnic category. This table excludes Latinos from the racial categories and assigns them to a separate category. Hispanics/Latinos may be of any race.
Race / Ethnicity (NH = Non-Hispanic)	Pop 2000	Pop 2010	Pop 2020	% 2000	% 2010	% 2020
White alone (NH)	43,820	38,457	31,454	80.05%	66.03%	52.68%
Black or African American alone (NH)	4,430	6,602	8,832	8.09%	11.34%	14.79%
Native American or Alaska Native alone (NH)	85	103	144	0.16%	0.17%	0.24%
Asian alone (NH)	1,713	4,591	6,249	3.13%	7.88%	10.47%
Pacific Islander alone (NH)	18	19	15	0.03%	0.03%	0.03%
Some Other Race alone (NH)	144	138	391	0.26%	0.24%	0.65%
Mixed Race or Multi-Racial (NH)	951	1,343	2,303	1.74%	2.31%	3.86%
Hispanic or Latino (any race)	3,579	6,988	10,325	6.54%	12.00%	17.29%
Total	54,740	58,241	59,713	100.00%	100.00%	100.00%

Reflecting national trends, Manchester has diversified significantly in recent decades.

Historical population
Census	Pop.	Note	%±
1850	2,546		—
1860	3,294		29.4%
1870	4,223		28.2%
1880	6,462		53.0%
1890	8,222		27.2%
1900	10,601		28.9%
1910	13,641		28.7%
1920	18,370		34.7%
1930	21,973		19.6%
1940	23,799		8.3%
1950	34,116		43.4%
1960	42,102		23.4%
1970	47,994		14.0%
1980	49,761		3.7%
1990	51,618		3.7%
2000	54,740		6.0%
2010	58,241		6.4%
2020	59,713		2.5%
U.S. Decennial Census

As of the 2000 census, there were 54,740 people, 23,197 households, and 14,010 families residing in the town. The population density was 2,008.2 inhabitants per square mile (775.4/km^{2}). There were 24,256 housing units at an average density of 889.9 per square mile (343.6/km^{2}). The racial makeup of the town was 82.77% White, 8.42% African American, 0.20% Native American, 3.15% Asian, 0.03% Pacific Islander, 3.12% from other races, and 2.31% from two or more races. Hispanic or Latino of any race were 6.54% of the population.

There were 23,197 households, out of which 28.2% had children under the age of 18 living with them, 43.8% were married couples living together, 13.0% had a female householder with no husband present, and 39.6% were non-families. Of all households, 31.1% were made up of individuals, and 10.1% had someone living alone who was 65 years of age or older. The average household size was 2.32 and the average family size was 2.93.

In the town, the population was spread out, with 22.8% under the age of 18, 8.0% from 18 to 24, 33.0% from 25 to 44, 22.1% from 45 to 64, and 14.2% who were 65 years of age or older. The median age was 36 years. For every 100 females, there were 91.2 males. For every 100 females age 18 and over, there were 87.7 males.

The median income for a household in the town was $49,426, and the median income for a family was $58,769. Males had a median income of $41,893 versus $32,562 for females. The per capita income for the town was $25,989. About 6.0% of families and 8.0% of the population were below the poverty line, including 11.1% of those under age 18 and 7.7% of those age 65 or over.

== Arts and culture ==
Stemming from a heritage of historic culture, Manchester is home to the second-oldest operating pipe band in the United States, the Manchester Pipe Band, a grade 2 pipe band, which was founded in 1914. Cheney Hall is the home of The Little Theater of Manchester, a 60 year old community theater group. The city is also home to a nonprofit orchestra, the Manchester Symphony Orchestra and Chorale, which has been performing and educating youths in music in the community since 1960.

Manchester hosts four museums. The Fire Museum is housed in a restored 1901 firehouse building. The museum's firefighting equipment and memorabilia include leather fire buckets used in colonial times, a display showing the evolution of sprinkler systems, a horse-drawn hose wagon, a 1921 Ahrens-Fox fire pumper, and a 105-foot (32 m) 1911 water tower. The Lutz Children's Museum has participatory exhibits covering art, history, science, nature and ethnology. The museum's permanent collection includes small live animals. The Old Manchester Museum, focusing on local history, is operated by the Manchester Historical Society. Permanent exhibits include examples of Cheney silk, Pitkin glass, and Spencer Repeating Rifles; the museum also houses the Manchester Sports Hall of Fame. The Cheney Homestead Museum is an eighteenth-century house of the founders of the Cheney Brothers Silk Company. On exhibit are examples of period furniture and artwork. Also on site is the one-room Keeney Schoolhouse dating from 1751.

Wickham Park, a non-profit private foundation, is located on Manchester and East Hartford property. The 53-acre (210,000 m^{2}) Oak Grove Nature Center is a nature preserve with rivers, ponds, and hiking trails and hosts educational nature classes aimed at children. Case Mountain Recreational Area, located in the less populated southeast corner of Manchester, is popular for hiking, mountain biking, and has a great view of the Hartford skyline to the west. Charter Oak Park, located in downtown, is popular for basketball, softball, and tennis, and includes four community soccer field. The park underwent a $2 million renovation in 2017 which improved existing infrastructure in addition to adding a musical garden, jogging tracks, bathrooms, and an upgraded playground.

The annual auto show Cruisin' on Main Street is held every August and is one of the largest shows of its kind in the northeast, showcasing over 14,000 vintage and rare vehicles and attracting over 400,000 visitors since its inception in 2001. The event has also endowed an annual scholarship for local area high school students pursuing further education.

== Sports ==
Manchester Country Club opened in 1917 and was originally designed by Tom Bendelow and Deveroux Emmet. In 1935, it was redesigned in by A.W. Tillinghast. The golf course features a classical New England design and holds an annual open tournament.

Perhaps the most enduring sports legacy of the town is the Manchester Road Race, a 4.748 mile footrace which is held every Thanksgiving morning. It is the second most popular race in New England, behind the Boston Marathon. The event attracts over 10,000 participants, including Olympians, world record holders, and international athletes, in addition to thousands of spectators. The race was first run in 1927, and benefits muscular dystrophy research as well as over a dozen other charities.

The Manchester Silkworms, named for the town's storied past as a silk producer and the world's largest silk mill, were a collegiate summer baseball team founded in 2000. Several former players continued their career to the major leagues, including former Red Sox catcher and veteran Ryan Lavarnway. The team relocated to Laconia, New Hampshire, after the 2009 season.

== Government and politics ==
Presidential vote by party
Year	Democratic	Republican
2020	68.39% 19,455	29.98% 8,530
2016	60.83% 15,109	33.65% 8,358
2012	65.21% 15,565	33.35% 7,961
2008	66.85% 17,782	31.79% 8,457
2004	59.58% 15,269	38.82% 9,949
2000	58.70% 14,184	35.34% 8,541
1996	54.39% 13,003	31.33% 7,490
1992	43.39% 12,266	32.30% 9,132
1988	51.33% 12,891	47.82% 12,009
1984	40.07% 10,023	59.48% 14,878
1980	38.39% 9,459	43.99% 10,839
1976	47.56% 11,690	51.79% 12,728
1972	42.23% 10,413	56.96% 14,044
1968	50.74% 11,052	44.65% 9,725
1964	68.79% 14,548	31.21% 6,601
1960	48.99% 10,454	51.01% 10,885

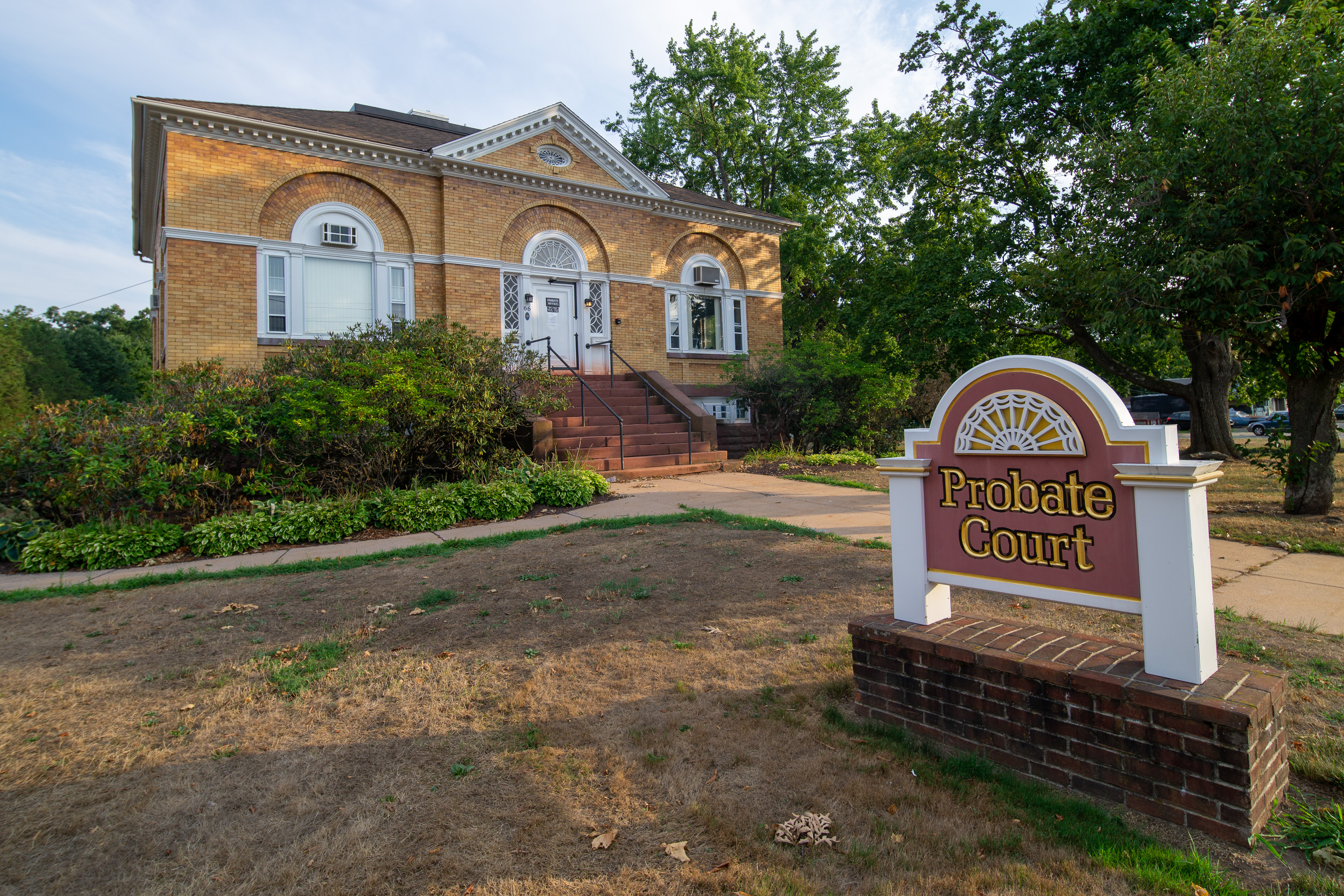
Manchester, Connecticut Probate Court

The town was governed in the old New England tradition of town meeting until 1907, when the town adopted a new charter, creating a more efficient method of governing, with a Board of Selectmen charged with the responsibility of running the town. In the mid-twentieth century, Manchester adopted a new charter constituting a council-manager government that is still in use today.

The legislative function is performed by a bipartisan Board of Directors consisting of nine board members, who are elected biennially for two year terms. The Board of Directors elects a Mayor from its membership for the two year term, and also appoints the General Manager.

=== State ===
General Assembly Representatives
Representative	Chamber	District	Party
Jeffrey Currey	House of Representatives	11th	Dem
Jason Doucette	House of Representatives	13th	Dem
Geoff Luxenberg	House of Representatives	12th	Dem
Jason Rojas	House of Representatives	9th	Dem

Connecticut Senate
Representative	Chamber	District	Party
MD Rahman	Senate	4th	Dem

United States House of Representatives
Representative	Chamber	District	Party
John B. Larson	Congress	1st	Dem

In addition to being represented in the U.S. Senate by Richard Blumenthal and Chris Murphy.

Voter Registration and Party Enrollment as of October 26, 2021
Party	Active voters	Inactive voters	Total voters	Percentage
Democratic	13,788	1,431	15,219	40.74%
Republican	5,236	505	5,741	15.37%
Unaffiliated	13,629	2,019	15,648	41.89%
Minor parties	659	87	746	2.00%
Total	33,312	4,042	37,354	100%

== Education ==
=== Public schools ===
- Manchester High School (grades 9–12)
- Howell Cheney Technical High School (grades 9–12)

=== Magnet schools ===
- Great Path Academy (grades 9–12)
- Discovery Academy (grades Pre-K–5)

=== Private schools ===
- East Catholic High School (grades 9–12)

=== Post-secondary education ===
- Manchester Community College, a two-year community college

== Media ==
=== Newspaper ===
Manchester is home to a local newspaper, the Journal Inquirer, which serves all of Manchester and the surrounding areas. The Hartford Courant also has a facility in Manchester and can be delivered anywhere in town.

== Emergency services ==
=== Fire department ===
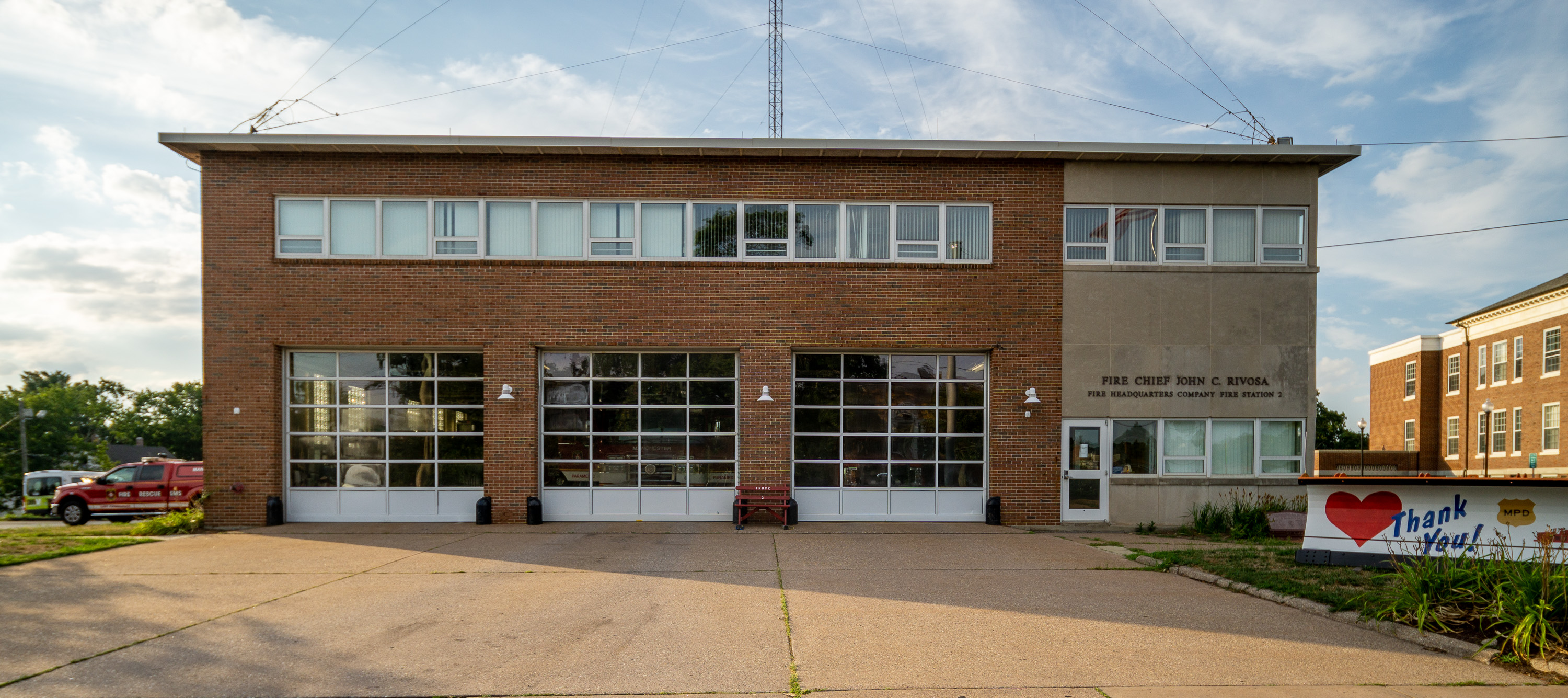
Manchester Fire Department Headquarters

The Manchester Fire Department was created when Manchester Fire Rescue EMS and the Eighth Utilities District merged following a vote of the taxpayers of the Eighth Utilities District. The vote took place on February 1, 2023, with an official merger date of July 1, 2023. The Manchester Fire Department is a full-time career department that operates from seven firehouses.

The Fire-Rescue-EMS Department was organized in 1897 after a fire destroyed the Weldon business block. It was a full-time career department that operated from five firehouses.

The Manchester Fire Department-Eighth Utilities District was a combination (paid and volunteer) fire department, established in 1888 as a separate fire department within the northwest corner of the town. It was not affiliated with the Town of Manchester government and was instead governed by its own board of directors.

=== Police department ===
The Manchester Police Department was established in 1896. It is staffed by approximately 120 officers. The department consists of 3 divisions, Field Services, Support Services, and Administrative Services.

=== Medical Transport ===
Ambulance Service of Manchester (ASM) is a private, for-profit company that operates out of a station on New State Road in Manchester, and provides basic life support-level transport service. ASM also provides intercept and transport paramedic service to a number of towns in Hartford, Tolland, and Windham counties. ASM will provide advanced life support when fire department paramedics are unavailable.

== Infrastructure ==
=== Transportation ===
==== Roads ====
Manchester has parts of three interstate highways (I-84, I-384, and I-291) and Route 6 and Route 44 together constitute Manchester's principal east/west arterial. Route 30 is an east/west arterial in the northern section of town. Route 83 is Manchester's principal north/south arterial. Starting as South Main Street at the southern border with Glastonbury, Route 83 becomes Main Street through the center of town.

==== Public transportation ====
Manchester is served by the Hartford division of Connecticut Transit. Routes 80, 82, 83, 84, 85, 88, and 121 connect Manchester directly to the city of Hartford.

==== Rail ====
No passenger service currently exists in town. Freight service from Hartford is provided by Connecticut Southern Railroad.

The closest passenger rail service is available at Hartford's Union Station, approximately 10 miles west.

==== Airports ====
Bradley International Airport, in Windsor Locks, Connecticut, is twenty minutes north of downtown Hartford. It features over 150 daily departures to over 30 destinations on nine airlines. Other airports serving the Hartford area include:

- Hartford–Brainard Airport, found in Hartford off I-91 and close to Wethersfield, serves charter flights and local flights.
- Westover Metropolitan Airport, located in Chicopee, Massachusetts, 27 miles (43 km) north of Hartford, serves commercial, local, charter, and military flights
- Tweed New Haven Airport, located in New Haven, Connecticut, is served by Avelo Airlines

==== Bicycling ====
Manchester has several on and off-road bicycle routes. The two most popular routes are the Charter Oak Greenway and the Hop River State Park Trail. Portions of each of those routes have been designated as parts of the East Coast Greenway.

== Notable people ==
- Nathan Agostinelli, mayor and State Comptroller
- Astrid Allwyn, 1930s movie actress
- Elizabeth S. Anderson, philosopher and MacArthur Fellow
- Geno Auriemma, head coach of UConn women's basketball team, 2012 and 2016 U.S. women's national team
- Dick Berggren, motorsport announcer and magazine editor
- Daniel C. Burbank, NASA astronaut
- Tim Cate, professional baseball player
- Russell Cheney, American Impressionist
- Sherwood Cheney, US Army brigadier general
- Carol Lynn Curchoe, reproductive biologist
- Seth DeValve, football tight end for the Carolina Panthers
- Dr. Dot, massage therapist
- David Efianayi (born 1995), basketball player in the Israeli Basketball Premier League
- Addie C. Strong Engle (1845–1926), author, publisher
- Mary Ann Handley, former Connecticut state senator
- Jay Johnstone, former professional baseball player and commentator
- Larry Lisciotti, pool player
- Jean Marzollo, children's author and illustrator
- Bill Masse, US Olympian
- Henry Molaison, noted memory disorder patient
- Fred Norris, radio personality on The Howard Stern Show
- James B. Olcott, turfgrass farmer and influential citizen
- Frederick Walker Pitkin, governor of Colorado from 1879 to 1883
- Richard Plepler, television executive
- Alberto Salazar, former world-class long-distance runner and 4x winner of Boston and New York marathons, and coach until he was banned for life
- John Shea Jr., politician, jurist, businessman
- Kory Sheets, former NFL player
- Christopher Spencer, inventor of Spencer repeating rifle
- Dana White, president of the Ultimate Fighting Championship

== See also ==
- Hartford Distributors shooting
- Manchester Silkworms
- Truth Serum, an Eisner-nominated comic which takes place in Manchester
