= Cheney Brothers Historic District =

Historic district in Connecticut, United States

- U.S. National Register of Historic Places
- U.S. National Historic Landmark District
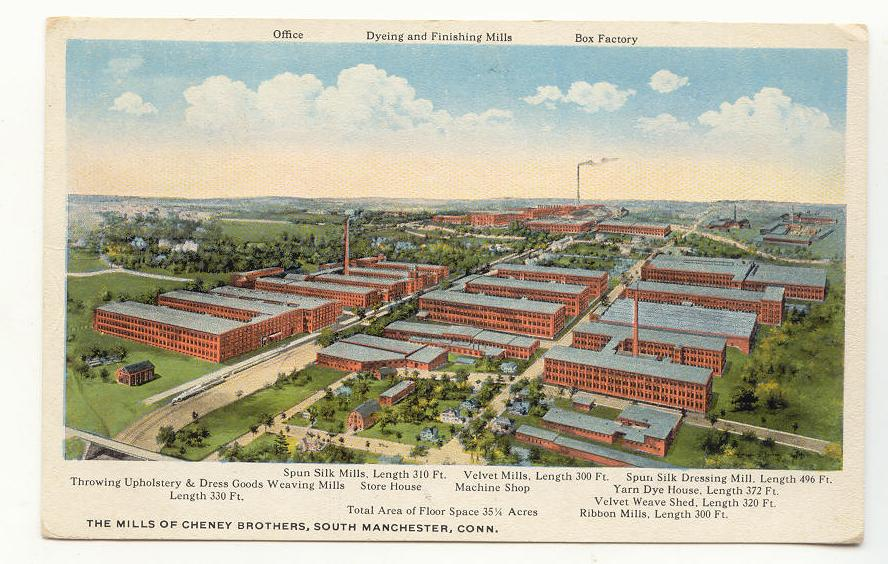
- Cheney Brothers Mills, South Manchester, about 1920

- Location within Connecticut Location within the United States
- Location: Manchester, Connecticut
- Coordinates: 41°45′52.2″N 72°31′31.8″W
- Area: 175 acres (71 ha)
- Built: 1838
- Architect: Cheney Bros. Manufacturing Co.
- Architectural style: Late 19th And 20th Century Revivals, Late Victorian
- NRHP reference No.: 78002885

Significant dates
- Added to NRHP: June 2, 1978
- Designated NHLD: June 2, 1978

The Cheney Brothers Historic District was a center of the silk industry in Manchester, Connecticut, in the late 19th and early 20th century. The 175-acre (71 ha) district includes over 275 mill buildings, workers houses, churches, schools and Cheney family mansions. These structures represent the well-preserved company town of the Cheney Brothers silk manufacturing company, the first America-based silk company to properly raise and process silkworms, and to develop the difficult techniques of spinning and weaving silk. The area was declared a National Historic Landmark in 1978.

== Description and history ==
The Cheney Brothers district encompasses a 175-acre (71 ha) area of South Manchester, bounded roughly on the south by Interstate 384 on the west by Fairfield Avenue, on the north by West, High, Laurel, Forest, and Eldridge Streets, and on the east by Chestnut and Spruce Streets. The centerpiece of the district is a collection of sixteen surviving mill buildings, which mostly front on Pine and Elm Streets. These are almost all brick buildings, some of them quite large, most of which were built between about 1880 and 1920. The mansions of the Cheney family are located in a 70-acre (28 ha) area east of the mills; this is a park-like area including 13 primary buildings, the oldest of which is the original 1780s Cheney Homestead, now a historic house museum owned by the Manchester Historical Society. These houses were built from the early 19th century into the early 20th century by various members of the family. There are large clusters of mill worker housing built by the Cheneys to the north and west of the mill complex, with a smaller cluster east of the mansion area. These are typically frame structures one or two stories in height, most of them 19th century in construction. Public architecture built by the Cheneys include a large social venue (Cheney Hall) at 177 Hartford Road, a fire station at 230 Pine Street, a water treatment plant at 49 Cooper Hill Street, and several schools and churches.

The Cheney silk processing business began in the 1830s with the cultivation of mulberry trees, which silkworms fed on, and expanded in 1838 into a silk-spinning operation that was located near the family homestead. In 1840 the mulberry market crashed, and many trees were affected by a blight. The Cheneys focused their business efforts on the spinning in the 1840s, and had by the end of that decade mastered the difficult process of weaving silk. In 1847 Frank Cheney developed a machine that significantly sped up the spinning process. By the 1860s the Cheney Brothers were an international leader in the business. In South Manchester, the Cheneys practiced what was termed welfare capitalism, intending to provide a comprehensive living and working environment for their workers. When they needed to improve the water supply for their factories, the facilities were used to provide water to residential areas as well, and the Cheneys' electric company also provided power to a much larger area than the factory. Churches were built on land donated by the company, as were schools and other public facilities. The Cheneys' silk business began to decline in the 1920s with the advent of synthetic fibers, and was further hurt by the Great Depression. The company sold off its utilities and much of its housing. The Cheneys sold the business in 1954, which continues to operate at a much smaller scale within the factory complex.

The district was designated a National Historic Landmark and was listed on the National Register of Historic Places in 1978.

The mills had a cultural impact on Manchester. The city seal focuses on silk and a local baseball team was named the Silkworms.

== See also ==
- Ward Cheney
- Howell Cheney
- List of National Historic Landmarks in Connecticut
- National Register of Historic Places listings in Hartford County, Connecticut
